= Gene Kelly Awards =

High school musical theater awards in Pittsburgh, Pennsylvania, US

- Current: 35th Gene Kelly Awards
- Awarded for: Excellence in High School Musical Theater
- Country: United States
- Presented by: Pittsburgh Civic Light Opera
- First award: 1991
- Website: www.pittsburghclo.org

The Gene Kelly Awards for Excellence in High School Musical Theater, named after the actor/director Gene Kelly, are given out yearly by Pittsburgh Civic Light Opera. The award was founded in 1991 and celebrates excellence in the musicals of the Pittsburgh area's high schools. Technical/design awards and group awards including Outstanding Musical are awarded in four levels based on production budget. The organization also offers scholarships to high school seniors involved in any aspect of their school's production. As of 2025, there are 34 participating schools. In 2009, the Gene Kelly Awards spawned the National High School Musical Theater Awards, nicknamed "The Jimmys", which Pittsburgh CLO co-produces with Nederlander Presentations. The Awards were cancelled in 2020 due to the COVID-19 pandemic. The Awards in 2021 were limited to individual awards only.

== Categories ==
- Outstanding Actor
- Outstanding Actress
- Outstanding Supporting Actor
- Outstanding Supporting Actress
- Outstanding Student Artist - Individual or Group
- Outstanding Student Orchestra
- Outstanding Vocal Ensemble*
- Outstanding Dance Ensemble*
- Outstanding Crew/Technical Execution*
- Outstanding Scenic Design*
- Outstanding Costume Design*
- Outstanding Lighting Design*
- Outstanding Musical*

*Awards given in four budget categories

== Participating schools ==
- Avonworth High School
- Baldwin High School
- Bishop Canevin High School
- Brentwood High School
- Carlynton Jr./Sr. High School
- Central Catholic / Oakland Catholic High Schools
- Chartiers Valley High School
- Deer Lakes High School
- Elizabeth Forward High School
- Gateway High School
- Hampton High School
- Keystone Oaks High School
- McKeesport Area High School
- Montour High School
- North Hills High School
- Our Lady of the Sacred Heart High School
- Penn Hills High School
- Pine-Richland High School
- Pittsburgh Allderdice High School
- Pittsburgh CAPA 6-12
- Plum Senior High School
- Quaker Valley High School
- Redeemer Lutheran School
- Riverview Jr./Sr. High School
- Serra Catholic High School
- Seton-La Salle Catholic High School
- Sewickley Academy
- Shady Side Academy Senior School
- Springdale Jr./Sr. High School
- St. Joseph High School
- Thomas Jefferson High School
- Upper St. Clair High School
- West Allegheny High School
- Westinghouse Arts Academy
- Woodland Hills High School

== Former participants ==
- Brashear High School
- Bethel Park High School
- East Allegheny High School
- Eden Christian Academy
- Fox Chapel Area High School
- Moon Area High School
- North Allegheny High School
- North Catholic High School
- Northgate Junior – Senior High School
- Peabody High School
- Perry Traditional Academy
- Propel Braddock Hills
- Robinson Township Christian School
- Schenley High School
- Shaler Area High School
- South Park High School
- South Allegheny High School
- South Fayette High School
- Steel Valley High School
- Vincentian Academy
- West Mifflin Area High School
- Winchester Thurston School

== Nominees and winners ==
=== 2026 nominees ===
Category	Nominee	Role	School	Musical
Outstanding Scenic Design; Budget Category I	--- --- ---	--- --- ---	Bishop Canevin **Our Lady of the Sacred Heart** Pittsburgh Allderdice	Into the Woods **Hadestown: Teen Edition** Curtains
Outstanding Scenic Design; Budget Category II	--- --- ---	--- --- ---	Central & Oakland Catholic **McKeesport** Plum	The Addams Family Musical **Fiddler on the Roof** Seussical
Outstanding Scenic Design; Budget Category III	--- --- ---	--- --- ---	Elizabeth Forward North Hills **Shady Side Academy**	The Prince of Egypt Mamma Mia! **Anything Goes (2022 Revision)**
Outstanding Scenic Design; Budget Category IV	--- --- ---	--- --- ---	Pine-Richland **Thomas Jefferson** Woodland Hills	Chicago: Teen Edition **9 to 5** Young Frankenstein
Outstanding Costume Design; Budget Category I	--- --- ---	--- --- ---	Our Lady of the Sacred Heart **Saint Joseph** Springdale	Hadestown: Teen Edition **Joseph and the Amazing Technicolor Dreamcoat** The Addams Family Musical
Outstanding Costume Design; Budget Category II	--- --- ---	--- --- ---	**Central & Oakland Catholic** McKeesport Plum	**The Addams Family Musical** Fiddler on the Roof Seussical
Outstanding Costume Design; Budget Category III	--- --- ---	--- --- ---	Elizabeth Forward **Penn Hills** West Allegheny	The Prince of Egypt **Once on this Island** 9 to 5
Outstanding Costume Design; Budget Category IV	--- --- ---	--- --- ---	Hampton Pine-Richland **Riverview**	Once Upon a Mattress Chicago: Teen Edition **The Addams Family Musical**
Outstanding Lighting Design; Budget Category I	--- --- ---	--- --- ---	**Our Lady of the Sacred Heart** Pittsburgh Allderdice Saint Joseph	**Hadestown: Teen Edition** Curtains Joseph and the Amazing Technicolor Dreamcoat
Outstanding Lighting Design; Budget Category II	--- --- ---	--- --- ---	**Central & Oakland Catholic** McKeesport Plum	**The Addams Family Musical** Fiddler on the Roof Seussical
Outstanding Lighting Design; Budget Category III	--- --- ---	--- --- ---	Elizabeth Forward **North Hills** Pittsburgh CAPA	The Prince of Egypt **Mamma Mia!** Guys and Dolls
Outstanding Lighting Design; Budget Category IV	--- --- ---	--- --- ---	Gateway **Pine-Richland** Woodland Hills	Catch Me If You Can **Chicago: Teen Edition** Young Frankenstein
Outstanding Student Orchestra	--- --- --- --- --- ---	--- --- --- --- --- ---	Avonworth **Pine-Richland** Pittsburgh Allderdice Pittsburgh CAPA Shady Side Academy Thomas Jefferson	The Phantom of the Opera **Chicago: Teen Edition** Curtains Guys and Dolls Anything Goes (2022 Revision) 9 to 5
Outstanding Vocal Ensemble; Budget Category I	--- --- ---	--- --- ---	**Our Lady of the Sacred Heart** Pittsburgh Allderdice Saint Joseph	**Hadestown: Teen Edition** Curtains Joseph and the Amazing Technicolor Dreamcoat
Outstanding Vocal Ensemble; Budget Category II	--- --- ---	--- --- ---	Central & Oakland Catholic McKeesport **Plum**	The Addams Family Musical Fiddler on the Roof **Seussical**
Outstanding Vocal Ensemble; Budget Category III	--- --- ---	--- --- ---	**Elizabeth Forward** Pittsburgh CAPA West Allegheny	**The Prince of Egypt** Guys and Dolls 9 to 5
Outstanding Vocal Ensemble; Budget Category IV	--- --- ---	--- --- ---	Gateway **Pine-Richland** Westinghouse Arts Academy	Catch Me If You Can **Chicago: Teen Edition** Into the Woods
Outstanding Dance Ensemble; Budget Category I	--- --- ---	--- --- ---	**Our Lady of the Sacred Heart** Pittsburgh Allderdice Saint Joseph	**Hadestown: Teen Edition** Curtains Joseph and the Amazing Technicolor Dreamcoat
Outstanding Dance Ensemble; Budget Category II	--- --- ---	--- --- ---	Central & Oakland Catholic **Plum** Quaker Valley	The Addams Family Musical **Seussical** Alice By Heart
Outstanding Dance Ensemble; Budget Category III	--- --- ---	--- --- ---	**Elizabeth Forward** North Hills West Allegheny	**The Prince of Egypt** Mamma Mia! 9 to 5
Outstanding Dance Ensemble; Budget Category IV	--- --- ---	--- --- ---	Gateway **Pine-Richland** Woodland Hills	Catch Me If You Can **Chicago: Teen Edition** Young Frankenstein
Outstanding Crew/Technical Execution; Budget Category I	--- --- ---	--- --- ---	**Our Lady of the Sacred Heart** Pittsburgh Allderdice Saint Joseph	**Hadestown: Teen Edition** Curtains Joseph and the Amazing Technicolor Dreamcoat
Outstanding Crew/Technical Execution; Budget Category II	--- --- ---	--- --- ---	**Central & Oakland Catholic** McKeesport Plum	**The Addams Family Musical** Fiddler on the Roof Seussical
Outstanding Crew/Technical Execution; Budget Category III	--- --- ---	--- --- ---	Keystone Oaks North Hills **Shady Side Academy**	Mamma Mia! Mamma Mia! **Anything Goes (2022 Revision)**
Outstanding Crew/Technical Execution; Budget Category IV	--- --- ---	--- --- ---	Gateway **Pine-Richland** Thomas Jefferson	Catch Me If You Can **Chicago: Teen Edition** 9 to 5
Outstanding Student Artist	Ava Anderson Anastasia Bakaturski Spencer Callaghan **Andrew Horvath** Juliet Moore Mary-Kate Stock	Stage Manager Dramaturg Student Director **Student Sound Technician; Lead Student Carpenter** Choreographer Student PR Leader	Gateway McKeesport Elizabeth Forward **Thomas Jefferson** Deer Lakes Baldwin	Catch Me If You Can Fiddler on the Roof The Prince of Egypt **9 to 5** Damn Yankees 9 to 5
Outstanding Supporting Actor	Nathan Connelly **Sonny Davis** Vincent Jackson Robert Reed-Williams, Jr. Lucas Sotereanos Adam Steiner	Sir Harry **Igor** Uncle Fester Rapunzel's Prince Motel The Monster	Hampton **Woodland Hills** Central & Oakland Catholic Westinghouse Arts Academy McKeesport Woodland Hills	Once Upon a Mattress **Young Frankenstein** The Addams Family Musical Into the Woods Fiddler on the Roof Young Frankenstein
Outstanding Supporting Actress	Lola Armfield Emerson Henry Caisey Kreg Sophia Priore **Livia Rocco** Olivia Safran	Holly Miriam Roz Keith Matron "Mama" Morton **Elizabeth Benning** Frau Blücher	Chartiers Valley Elizabeth Forward West Allegheny Pine-Richland **Woodland Hills** Woodland Hills	The Wedding Singer The Prince of Egypt 9 to 5 Chicago: Teen Edition **Young Frankenstein** Young Frankenstein
Outstanding Actor	Leo Alfieri Will Benedum **Paxon Masters** Eamonn McElfresh Theodor Mertz Michael Pfeffercorn	Dr. Frederick Frankenstein Baker **The Phantom** Sky Masterson Gomez Addams Tevye	Woodland Hills Westinghouse Arts Academy **Avonworth** Pittsburgh CAPA Central & Oakland Catholic McKeesport	Young Frankenstein Into the Woods **The Phantom of the Opera** Guys and Dolls The Addams Family Musical Fiddler on the Roof
Outstanding Actress	Elise Duckworth Marian Mangual Lucy Myers Parker Pile **Loren Prisuta** Annabelle Watson	Roxie Hart Sarah Brown Christine Daaé Donna Sheridan **Velma Kelly** Miss Adelaide	Pine-Richland Seton LaSalle Avonworth North Hills **Pine-Richland** Seton LaSalle	Chicago: Teen Edition Guys and Dolls The Phantom of the Opera Mamma Mia! **Chicago: Teen Edition** Guys and Dolls
Outstanding Musical; Budget Category I	--- ---	--- ---	**Our Lady of the Sacred Heart** Saint Joseph	**Hadestown: Teen Edition** Joseph and the Amazing Technicolor Dreamcoat
Outstanding Musical; Budget Category II	--- ---	--- ---	**Central & Oakland Catholic** Plum	**The Addams Family Musical** Seussical
Outstanding Musical; Budget Category III	--- ---	--- ---	**Elizabeth Forward** North Hills	**The Prince of Egypt** Mamma Mia!
Outstanding Musical; Budget Category IV	--- ---	--- ---	**Pine-Richland** Woodland Hills	**Chicago: Teen Edition** Young Frankenstein

=== 2025 nominees and winners ===
Category	Nominee	Role	School	Musical
Outstanding Scenic Design; Budget Category I	--- --- ---	--- --- ---	Avonworth **Carlynton** Our Lady of the Sacred Heart	Sweeney Todd **Hadestown** Children of Eden
Outstanding Scenic Design; Budget Category II	--- --- ---	--- --- ---	**Central & Oakland Catholic** Elizabeth Forward Westinghouse	**Newsies** Hadestown The SpongeBob Musical
Outstanding Scenic Design; Budget Category III	--- --- ---	--- --- ---	Montour **North Hills** Pittsburgh CAPA	Disney's The Little Mermaid **Alice by Heart** Natasha, Pierre & the Great Comet of 1812
Outstanding Scenic Design; Budget Category IV	--- --- ---	--- --- ---	**Hampton** Riverview Woodland Hills	**Hadestown** Something Rotten! Hairspray
Outstanding Costume Design; Budget Category I	--- --- ---	--- --- ---	Avonworth Carlynton **Our Lady of the Sacred Heart**	Sweeney Todd Hadestown **Children of Eden**
Outstanding Costume Design; Budget Category II	--- --- ---	--- --- ---	Elizabeth Forward McKeesport **Westinghouse**	Hadestown Titanic the Musical **The SpongeBob Musical**
Outstanding Costume Design; Budget Category III	--- --- ---	--- --- ---	Montour **North Hills** Pittsburgh CAPA	Disney's The Little Mermaid **Alice by Heart** Natasha, Pierre & the Great Comet of 1812
Outstanding Costume Design; Budget Category IV	--- --- ---	--- --- ---	Hampton Riverview **Woodland Hills**	Hadestown Something Rotten! **Hairspray**
Outstanding Lighting Design; Budget Category I	--- --- ---	--- --- ---	Carlynton **Our Lady of the Sacred Heart** Pittsburgh Allderdice	Hadestown **Children of Eden** 9 to 5: The Musical
Outstanding Lighting Design; Budget Category II	--- --- ---	--- --- ---	Chartiers Valley Elizabeth Forward **Westinghouse**	Something Rotten! Hadestown **The SpongeBob Musical**
Outstanding Lighting Design; Budget Category III	--- --- ---	--- --- ---	**North Hills** Pittsburgh CAPA West Allegheny	**Alice by Heart** Natasha, Pierre & the Great Comet of 1812 Footloose
Outstanding Lighting Design; Budget Category IV	--- --- ---	--- --- ---	**Hampton** Riverview Woodland Hills	**Hadestown** Something Rotten! Hairspray
Outstanding Student Orchestra	--- --- --- --- --- ---	--- --- --- --- --- ---	Hampton North Hills **Pine-Richland** Pittsburgh Allderdice Pittsburgh CAPA Shady Side Academy	Hadestown Alice by Heart **42nd Street** 9 to 5: The Musical Natasha, Pierre & the Great Comet of 1812 We Will Rock You
Outstanding Vocal Ensemble; Budget Category I	--- --- ---	--- --- ---	**Avonworth** Our Lady of the Sacred Heart Pittsburgh Allderdice	**Sweeney Todd** Children of Eden 9 to 5: The Musical
Outstanding Vocal Ensemble; Budget Category II	--- --- ---	--- --- ---	Elizabeth Forward McKeesport **Westinghouse**	Hadestown Titanic the Musical **The SpongeBob Musical**
Outstanding Vocal Ensemble; Budget Category III	--- --- ---	--- --- ---	**North Hills** Pittsburgh CAPA West Allegheny	**Alice by Heart** Natasha, Pierre & the Great Comet of 1812 Footloose
Outstanding Vocal Ensemble; Budget Category IV	--- --- ---	--- --- ---	**Hampton** Pine-Richland Woodland Hills	**Hadestown** 42nd Street Hairspray
Outstanding Dance Ensemble; Budget Category I	--- --- ---	--- --- ---	Avonworth Carlynton **Our Lady of the Sacred Heart**	Sweeney Todd Hadestown **Children of Eden**
Outstanding Dance Ensemble; Budget Category II	--- --- ---	--- --- ---	Central & Oakland Catholic Elizabeth Forward **Westinghouse**	Newsies Hadestown **The SpongeBob Musical**
Outstanding Dance Ensemble; Budget Category III	--- --- ---	--- --- ---	North Hills **Pittsburgh CAPA** West Allegheny	Alice by Heart **Natasha, Pierre & the Great Comet of 1812** Footloose
Outstanding Dance Ensemble; Budget Category IV	--- --- ---	--- --- ---	Hampton **Pine-Richland** Woodland Hills	Hadestown **42nd Street** Hairspray
Outstanding Crew/Technical Execution; Budget Category I	--- --- ---	--- --- ---	**Avonworth** Bishop Canevin Carlynton	**Sweeney Todd** Xanadu Hadestown
Outstanding Crew/Technical Execution; Budget Category II	--- --- ---	--- --- ---	Central & Oakland Catholic **Elizabeth Forward** Quaker Valley	Newsies **Hadestown** My Fair Lady
Outstanding Crew/Technical Execution; Budget Category III	--- --- ---	--- --- ---	**North Hills** Shady Side Academy West Allegheny	**Alice by Heart** We Will Rock You Footloose
Outstanding Crew/Technical Execution; Budget Category IV	--- --- ---	--- --- ---	**Hampton** Thomas Jefferson Woodland Hills	**Hadestown** Shrek the Musical Hairspray
Outstanding Student Artist	**Spencer Callaghan** Kennedy Edwards Ivy Freshwater & MaryKate Tracy Zack Frollini Grace Schmigel Mikayla Weber	**Student Director** Student Stage Manager Student Stage Managers Student Band Leader/Conductor Student Costume Coordinator Student Stage Manager and Scenic Charge	**Elizabeth Forward** Gateway Mountour Pittsburgh CAPA Avonworth Pittsburgh CAPA	**Hadestown** Once Upon a Mattress Disney's The Little Mermaid Natasha, Pierre & the Great Comet of 1812 Sweeney Todd Natasha, Pierre & the Great Comet of 1812
Outstanding Supporting Actor	Will Benedum **Wyatt Bernardini** Mycah Harris Carson McKinney Daniel Morgan Noah Prosky	Squidward Q. Tentacles **Old Prince Bolkonsky** Fedya Dolokhov Willard Hewitt Hades Thomas Nostradamus	Westinghouse **Pittsburgh CAPA** Pittsburgh CAPA West Allegheny Hampton Riverview	The SpongeBob Musical **Natasha, Pierre & the Great Comet of 1812** Natasha, Pierre & the Great Comet of 1812 Footloose Hadestown Something Rotten!
Outstanding Supporting Actress	Ady Burgoyne Faith Evans **Harmony Karwoski** Beatrice Laurenson Sophia Priore Siddaly Sykes	Tobias Ragg Tabatha/Cheshire Cat **Johanna** Beggar Woman Maggie Jones Portia	Avonworth North Hills **Avonworth** Avonworth Pine-Richland Riverview	Sweeney Todd Alice by Heart **Sweeney Todd** Sweeney Todd 42nd Street Something Rotten!
Outstanding Actor	Mateo Carrasco Amerik Cirota Severin Harmon Paxon Masters **Eamonn McElfresh** Vaughn Spencer	Orpheus SpongeBob SquarePants Bobby Child Sweeney Todd **Pierre Bezukhov** Julian Marsh	Carlynton Westinghouse Sewickley Academy Avonworth **Pittsburgh CAPA** Pine-Richland	Hadestown The SpongeBob Musical Crazy for You Sweeney Todd **Natasha, Pierre & the Great Comet of 1812** 42nd Street
Outstanding Actress	Hallie Cantola Anna Karmanos **Mariana Mangual** Lucy Myers Livia Rocco Ava Stropkaj	Sandy Cheeks Dorothy Brock **Ella** Mrs. Lovett Tracy Turnblad Ariel	Westinghouse Pine-Richland **Seton LaSalle** Avonworth Woodland Hills Montour	The SpongeBob Musical 42nd Street **Rodgers & Hammerstein's Cinderella** Sweeney Todd Hairspray Disney's The Little Mermaid
Outstanding Musical; Budget Category I	--- ---	--- ---	Avonworth **Our Lady of the Sacred Heart**	Sweeney Todd **Children of Eden**
Outstanding Musical; Budget Category II	--- ---	--- ---	Elizabeth Forward **Westinghouse**	Hadestown **The SpongeBob Musical**
Outstanding Musical; Budget Category III	--- ---	--- ---	**North Hills** Pittsburgh CAPA	**Alice by Heart** Natasha, Pierre & the Great Comet of 1812
Outstanding Musical; Budget Category IV	--- ---	--- ---	**Hampton** Woodland Hills	**Hadestown** Hairspray

=== 2024 nominees and winners ===
Category	Nominee	Role	School	Musical
Best Scenic Design; Budget Category I	--- --- ---	--- --- ---	**Bishop Canevin**; Our Lady of the Sacred Heart; Shady Side Academy	**All Shook Up**; Oklahoma! Zombie Prom
Best Scenic Design; Budget Category II	--- --- ---	--- --- ---	**Avonworth**; Quaker Valley; West Allegheny	**Into The Woods**; The Addams Family; Bye Bye Birdie
Best Scenic Design; Budget Category III	--- --- ---	--- --- ---	**Elizabeth Forward**; North Hills; Pittsburgh CAPA	**Big Fish**; The 25th Annual Putnam County Spelling Bee; Sweeney Todd
Best Scenic Design; Budget Category IV	--- --- ---	--- --- ---	Hampton; **Pine-Richland**; Thomas Jefferson	Tuck Everlasting; **Mamma Mia!** Beauty And The Beast
Best Costume Design; Budget Category I	--- --- ---	--- --- ---	Our Lady of the Sacred Heart; **Saint Joseph**; Shady Side Academy	Oklahoma! **Tarzan**; Zombie Prom
Best Costume Design; Budget Category II	--- --- ---	--- --- ---	**Avonworth**; Quaker Valley; Serra Catholic	**Into The Woods**; The Addams Family; The Addams Family
Best Costume Design; Budget Category III	--- --- ---	--- --- ---	North Hills; Pittsburgh CAPA; **Westinghouse**	The 25th Annual Putnam County Spelling Bee; Sweeney Todd; **Chicago**
Best Costume Design; Budget Category IV	--- --- ---	--- --- ---	Hampton; Thomas Jefferson; **Woodland Hills**	Tuck Everlasting; Beauty and the Beast; **Wonderland**
Best Lighting Design; Budget Category I	--- --- ---	--- --- ---	Our Lady of the Sacred Heart; Saint Joseph; **Shady Side Academy**	Oklahoma! Tarzan; **Zombie Prom**
Best Lighting Design; Budget Category II	--- --- ---	--- --- ---	**Avonworth**; Quaker Valley; West Allegheny	**Into The Woods**; The Addams Family; Bye Bye Birdie
Best Lighting Design; Budget Category III	--- --- ---	--- --- ---	North Hills; Pittsburgh CAPA; **Westinghouse**	The 25th Annual Putnam County Spelling Bee; Sweeney Todd; **Chicago**
Best Lighting Design; Budget Category IV	--- --- ---	--- --- ---	Pine-Richland; **Thomas Jefferson**; Woodland Hills	Mamma Mia! **Beauty and the Beast**; Wonderland
Best Student Orchestra	--- --- --- --- --- ---	--- --- --- --- --- ---	Hampton; North Hills; **Pine-Richland**; Shady Side Academy; Thomas Jefferson; Westinghouse	Tuck Everlasting; The 25th Annual Putnam County Spelling Bee; **Mamma Mia!** Zombie Prom; Beauty and the Beast; Chicago
Best Vocal Ensemble; Budget Category I	--- --- ---	--- --- ---	Bishop Canevin; **Our Lady of the Sacred Heart**; Shady Side Academy	All Shook Up; **Oklahoma!** Zombie Prom
Best Vocal Ensemble; Budget Category II	--- --- ---	--- --- ---	**Avonworth**; Quaker Valley; West Allegheny	**Into The Woods**; The Addams Family; Bye Bye Birdie
Best Vocal Ensemble; Budget Category III	--- --- ---	--- --- ---	North Hills; **Pittsburgh CAPA**; Westinghouse	The 25th Annual Putnam County Spelling Bee; **Sweeney Todd**; Chicago
Best Vocal Ensemble; Budget Category IV	--- --- ---	--- --- ---	Hampton; **Thomas Jefferson**; Woodland Hills	Tuck Everlasting; **Beauty and the Beast**; Wonderland
Best Dance Ensemble; Budget Category I	--- --- ---	--- --- ---	**Our Lady of the Sacred Heart**; Saint Joseph; Shady Side Academy	**Oklahoma!** Tarzan; Zombie Prom
Best Dance Ensemble; Budget Category II	--- --- ---	--- --- ---	Quaker Valley; Sewickley Academy; **West Allegheny**	The Addams Family; Singin' In The Rain; **Bye Bye Birdie**
Best Dance Ensemble; Budget Category III	--- --- ---	--- --- ---	North Hills; Pittsburgh CAPA; **Westinghouse**	The 25th Annual Putnam County Spelling Bee; Sweeney Todd; **Chicago**
Best Dance Ensemble; Budget Category IV	--- --- ---	--- --- ---	**Hampton**; Thomas Jefferson; Woodland Hills	**Tuck Everlasting**; Beauty and the Beast; Wonderland
Best Crew/Technical Execution; Budget Category I	--- --- ---	--- --- ---	Bishop Canevin; Saint Joseph; **Shady Side Academy**	All Shook Up; Tarzan; **Zombie Prom**
Best Crew/Technical Execution; Budget Category II	--- --- ---	--- --- ---	**Avonworth**; Keystone Oaks; McKeesport	**Into The Woods**; Anything Goes; Joseph...
Best Crew/Technical Execution; Budget Category III	--- --- ---	--- --- ---	**North Hills**; Pittsburgh CAPA; Westinghouse	**The 25th Annual Putnam County Spelling Bee**; Sweeney Todd; Chicago
Best Crew/Technical Execution; Budget Category IV	--- --- ---	--- --- ---	Pine-Richland; **Thomas Jefferson**; Woodland Hills	Mamma Mia! **Beauty and the Beast**; Wonderland
Outstanding Student Artist	**Brady Bandik**; Bree Boyd; Kennedy Edwards; Sophie Feldhues; Abigail Gindlesperger; Bailey Linza	**Lighting Designer**; Student Producer; Stage Manager; Dance Captain; Student Director; Choreographer	**Thomas Jefferson**; Woodland Hills; Gateway; Our Lady Of The Sacred Heart; Elizabeth Forward; Saint Joseph	**Beauty and the Beast**; Wonderland; Chicago; Oklahoma! Big Fish; Saint Joseph
Best Supporting Actor	Cole Johnston; Jack Kelly; Leo Matthews; **Eamonn McElfresh**; Jack Miller; Javian Ortega-Rodriguez	Vice Principal Douglas Panch; Chip Tolentino; Jud Fry; **Tobias Ragg**; Fester Adams; Beadle Bamford	North Hills; North Hills; Our Lady of the Sacred Heart; **Pittsburgh CAPA**; Quaker Valley; Pittsburgh CAPA	The 25th Annual Putnam County Spelling Bee; The 25th Annual Putnam County Spelling Bee; Oklahoma! **Sweeney Todd**; The Addams Family; Sweeney Todd
Best Supporting Actress	Sophia Burik; Kelly Campion; Addy Janicki; Kayleigh Johnson; **Rissa Williams**; Jay Zhu	Rona Lisa Peretti; Marie (The Fairy Godmother); Mama Morton; Mrs. Potts; **Beggar Woman**; Delilah Strict	North Hills; Baldwin; Westinghouse; Thomas Jefferson; **Pittsburgh CAPA**; Shady Side Academy	The 25th Annual Putnam County Spelling Bee; Cinderella; Chicago; Beauty and the Beast; **Sweeney Todd**; Zombie Prom
Best Actor	Zachary Burkovich; Mateo Carrasco; Tyler Guinto-Brody; Severin Harmon; Max Peluso; **Kai Sachon**	Shrek; Gomez Addams; Edward Bloom; Cosmo Brown; Don Lockwood; **Sweeney Todd**	Penn Hills; Carlynton; Elizabeth Forward; Sewickley Academy; Sewickley Academy; **Pittsburgh CAPA**	Shrek; The Addams Family; Big Fish; Singin' In The Rain; Singin' In The Rain; **Sweeney Todd**
Best Actress	**Emma Hopf**; Hope Johnson; Mariana Mangual; Lucy Myers; Paulina Sanchez; Olivia Virgin	**William Barfee**; Mrs. Lovett; Dorothy; The Witch; Roxie Hart; Belle	**North Hills**; Pittsburgh CAPA; Seton LaSalle; Avonworth; Montour; Thomas Jefferson	**The 25th Annual Putnam County Spelling Bee**; Sweeney Todd; The Wizard of Oz; Into The Woods; Chicago; Beauty and the Beast
Best Musical; Budget Category I	--- --- ---	--- --- ---	Our Lady of the Sacred Heart; **Saint Joseph**	Oklahoma; **Tarzan**
Best Musical; Budget Category II	--- --- ---	--- --- ---	**Avonworth**; Quaker Valley	**Into The Woods**; The Addams Family
Best Musical; Budget Category III	--- --- ---	--- --- ---	North Hills; **Westinghouse**	The 25th Annual Putnam County Spelling Bee; **Chicago**
Best Musical; Budget Category IV	--- --- ---	--- --- ---	**Thomas Jefferson**; Woodland Hills	**Beauty and the Beast**; Wonderland

=== 2023 nominees and winners ===
Category	Nominee	Role	School	Musical
Best Scenic Design; Budget Category I	--- --- ---	--- --- ---	Mckeesport; Our Lady of the Sacred Heart; **Serra Catholic**	All Shook Up; Big Fish; **Little Shop of Horrors**
Best Scenic Design; Budget Category II	--- --- ---	--- --- ---	Carlynton; Quaker Valley; **Westinghouse**	Disney's The Little Mermaid; Anything Goes; **Joseph...**
Best Scenic Design; Budget Category III	--- --- ---	--- --- ---	**Elizabeth Forward**; Moon; Riverview	**The Hunchback Of Notre Dame**; Something Rotten! Young Frankenstein
Best Scenic Design; Budget Category IV	--- --- ---	--- --- ---	**Hampton**; Thomas Jefferson; Woodland Hills	**Something Rotten!** Anything Goes; Seussical
Best Costume Design; Budget Category I	--- --- ---	--- --- ---	Mckeesport; Our Lady of the Sacred Heart; **Redeemer Lutheran**	All Shook Up; Big Fish; **Rodgers & Hammerstein's Cinderella**
Best Costume Design; Budget Category II	--- --- ---	--- --- ---	Avonworth; **Carlynton**; Westinghouse	Grand Hotel; **Disney's The Little Mermaid**; Joseph...
Best Costume Design; Budget Category III	--- --- ---	--- --- ---	**Elizabeth Forward**; Moon; Riverview	**The Hunchback Of Notre Dame**; Something Rotten! Young Frankenstein
Best Costume Design; Budget Category IV	--- --- ---	--- --- ---	**Hampton**; Thomas Jefferson; Woodland Hills	**Something Rotten!** Anything Goes; Seussical
Best Lighting Design; Budget Category I	--- --- ---	--- --- ---	Mckeesport; **Our Lady of the Sacred Heart**; Serra Catholic	All Shook Up; **Big Fish**; Little Shop of Horrors
Best Lighting Design; Budget Category II	--- --- ---	--- --- ---	Avonworth; Chartiers Valley; **Westinghouse**	Grand Hotel; 9 to 5; **Joseph...**
Best Lighting Design; Budget Category III	--- --- ---	--- --- ---	**Elizabeth Forward**; Riverview; Shady Side Academy	**The Hunchback Of Notre Dame**; Young Frankenstein; Chicago: Teen Edition
Best Lighting Design; Budget Category IV	--- --- ---	--- --- ---	**Hampton**; Thomas Jefferson; Woodland Hills	**Something Rotten!** Anything Goes; Seussical
Best Student Orchestra	--- --- --- --- --- ---	--- --- --- --- --- ---	Avonworth; Moon; **Pittsburgh CAPA**; Shady Side Academy; Thomas Jefferson; Westinghouse	Grand Hotel; Something Rotten! **The Prom**; Chicago: Teen Edition; Anything Goes; Joseph...
Best Vocal Ensemble; Budget Category I	--- --- ---	--- --- ---	Mckeesport; **Our Lady of the Sacred Heart**; Serra Catholic	All Shook Up; **Big Fish**; Little Shop of Horrors
Best Vocal Ensemble; Budget Category II	--- --- ---	--- --- ---	Avonworth; Pittsburgh CAPA; **Westinghouse**	Grand Hotel; The Prom; **Joseph...**
Best Vocal Ensemble; Budget Category III	--- --- ---	--- --- ---	**Elizabeth Forward**; Moon; Riverview	**The Hunchback Of Notre Dame**; Something Rotten! Young Frankenstein
Best Vocal Ensemble; Budget Category IV	--- --- ---	--- --- ---	Hampton; Plum; **Thomas Jefferson**	Something Rotten! Fiddler On The Roof; **Anything Goes**
Best Dance Ensemble; Budget Category I	--- --- ---	--- --- ---	Mckeesport; **Our Lady of the Sacred Heart**; Sewickley Academy	All Shook Up; **Big Fish**; Big Fish: School Edition
Best Dance Ensemble; Budget Category II	--- --- ---	--- --- ---	Pittsburgh CAPA; Quaker Valley; **Westinghouse**	The Prom; Anything Goes; **Joseph...**
Best Dance Ensemble; Budget Category III	--- --- ---	--- --- ---	**Elizabeth Forward**; Moon; Riverview	**The Hunchback Of Notre Dame**; Something Rotten! Young Frankenstein
Best Dance Ensemble; Budget Category IV	--- --- ---	--- --- ---	**Hampton**; Thomas Jefferson; Woodland Hills	**Something Rotten!** Anything Goes; Seussical
Best Crew/Technical Execution; Budget Category I	--- --- ---	--- --- ---	Mckeesport; **Our Lady of the Sacred Heart**; Sewickley Academy	All Shook Up; **Big Fish**; Big Fish: School Edition
Best Crew/Technical Execution; Budget Category II	--- --- ---	--- --- ---	**Avonworth**; Bishop Canevin; Westinghouse	**Grand Hotel**; Freaky Friday; Joseph...
Best Crew/Technical Execution; Budget Category III	--- --- ---	--- --- ---	**Elizabeth Forward**; Moon; Shady Side Academy	**The Hunchback Of Notre Dame**; Something Rotten! Chicago: Teen Edition
Best Crew/Technical Execution; Budget Category IV	--- --- ---	--- --- ---	Hampton; **Thomas Jefferson**; Woodland Hills	Something Rotten! **Anything Goes**; Seussical
Outstanding Student Artist	Anna Boothsby; Charlotte Kinslow; Linz Thomas; David Poirier & Kulthoom Fatema Dinani; Jack Cipriani; **Alexa Custer**	Student Lighting Op/On-Stage Role Replacement; Understudy for Judy Bernly, Also cast as Roz Keither; Technical Lighting Designer; Documentarians; Advertisement Coordinator/Director; **Assistant Music Director**	Avonworth; Chartiers Valley; Elizabeth Forward; Hampton; Moon; **Pittsburgh CAPA**	Grand Hotel; 9 to 5 The Hunchback Of Notre Dame; Something Rotten! Something Rotten! **The Prom**
Best Supporting Actor	**Brooks Brady**; Primo Brodt-Jenkins; Avi Chetlin; David Keller; Hayden Krupp; Eli Wynn	**Thomas Nostradamus**; Harry Bright; Trent Oliver; Simeon; Moonface Martin; Thernardier	**Hampton**; Gateway; Pittsburgh CAPA; Westinghouse; Thomas Jefferson; Pittsburgh Allderdice	**Something Rotten!** Mamma Mia! The Prom; Joseph... Anything Goes; Les Miserables: School Edition
Best Supporting Actress	**Ashley Caldwell**; Annelise Hanson; Kenzie Heidenreich; Lila Kelley; Lucia Palmer; Natalie Whitfield	**Erma**; Mayzie Labird; Jan; Zinnia Wormwood; Portia; Rosie	**Thomas Jefferson**; Woodland Hills; West Allegheny; Baldwin; Moon; Gateway	**Anything Goes**; Seussical; Grease; Matilda; Something Rotten! Mamma Mia!
Best Actor	Jack Cipriani; Amerik Cirota; **Tyler Guinto-Brody**; Nathan Marks; Ben Stolarz; Kai Suyama	Nick Bottom; Joseph; **Quasimodo**; Dom Claude Frollo; Jean Valjean; Nick Bottom	Moon; Westinghouse; **Elizabeth Forward**; Elizabeth Forward; Pittsburgh Allderdice; Hampton	Something Rotten! Joseph... **The Hunchback Of Notre Dame**; The Hunchback Of Notre Dame; Les Miserables: School Edition; Something Rotten!
Best Actress	Felicity Dicken; Isabella Gricar; Brylee Hendry; **Kaitlyn Majewski**; Rachael Parsons; Ava Sandstrom	Judy Bernly; Narrator; Hodel; **Natalie Heller/Ed**; Hope Harcourt; Eponine	North Hills; Westinghouse; Plum; **McKeesport**; Thomas Jefferson; Pittsburgh Allderdice	9 To 5 Joseph... Fiddler On The Roof; **All Shook Up**; Anything Goes; Les Miserables: School Edition
Best Musical; Budget Category I	--- --- ---	--- --- ---	McKeesport; **Our Lady of the Sacred Heart**	All Shook Up; **Big Fish**
Best Musical; Budget Category II	--- --- ---	--- --- ---	Avonworth; **Westinghouse**	Grand Hotel; **Joseph...**
Best Musical; Budget Category III	--- --- ---	--- --- ---	**Elizabeth Forward**; Riverview	**The Hunchback Of Notre Dame**; Young Frankenstein
Best Musical; Budget Category IV	--- --- ---	--- --- ---	**Hampton**; Thomas Jefferson	**Something Rotten!** Anything Goes

=== 2022 nominees and winners ===
Category	Nominee	Role	School	Musical
Best Scenic Design; Budget Category I	--- --- ---	--- --- ---	Plum; Serra Catholic; **Westinghouse Arts Academy**	The Addams Family; Beauty and the Beast; **The 25th Annual Putnam County Spelling Bee**
Best Scenic Design; Budget Category II	--- --- ---	--- --- ---	Elizabeth Forward; **Hampton**; Pittsburgh CAPA	Little Shop Of Horrors; **Into The Woods**; Hairspray
Best Scenic Design; Budget Category III	--- --- ---	--- --- ---	Moon; North Hills; **Thomas Jefferson**	The Addams Family; Once Upon A Mattress; **Legally Blonde**
Best Scenic Design; Budget Category IV	--- --- ---	--- --- ---	Baldwin; Penn Hills; **Woodland Hills**	How To Succeed In Business Without Really Trying; Little Women; **Shrek**
Best Costume Design; Budget Category I	--- --- ---	--- --- ---	Chartiers Valley; Our Lady of the Sacred Heart; **Westinghouse Arts Academy**	Mary Poppins; Bye Bye Birdie; **The 25th Annual Putnam County Spelling Bee**
Best Costume Design; Budget Category II	--- --- ---	--- --- ---	**Avonworth**; Hampton; Pittsburgh CAPA	**The Mystery Of Edwin Drood**; Into The Woods; Hairspray
Best Costume Design; Budget Category III	--- --- ---	--- --- ---	**Moon**; Riverview; Thomas Jefferson	**The Addams Family**; The Little Mermaid; Legally Blonde
Best Costume Design; Budget Category IV	--- --- ---	--- --- ---	**Baldwin**; Pine-Richland; Woodland Hills	**How To Succeed In Business Without Really Trying**; Shrek; Shrek
Best Lighting Design; Budget Category I	--- --- ---	--- --- ---	Chartiers Valley; Plum; **Westinghouse Arts Academy**	Mary Poppins; The Addams Family; **The 25th Annual Putnam County Spelling Bee**
Best Lighting Design; Budget Category II	--- --- ---	--- --- ---	Elizabeth Forward; Hampton; **Shady Side Academy**	Little Shop Of Horrors; Into The Woods; **Pippin**
Best Lighting Design; Budget Category III	--- --- ---	--- --- ---	Moon; **Riverview**; Thomas Jefferson	The Addams Family; **The Little Mermaid**; Legally Blonde
Best Lighting Design; Budget Category IV	--- --- ---	--- --- ---	Penn Hills; Pine-Richland; **Woodland Hills**	Little Women; Shrek; **Shrek**
Best Student Orchestra	--- --- --- --- --- ---	--- --- --- --- --- ---	Hampton; North Hills; **Pine-Richland**; Plum; Sewickley Academy; Westinghouse Arts Academy	Into The Woods; Once Upon A Mattress; **Shrek**; The Addams Family; Urinetown; The 25th Annual Putnam County Spelling Bee
Best Vocal Ensemble; Budget Category I	--- --- ---	--- --- ---	Chartiers Valley; Serra Catholic; **Westinghouse Arts Academy**	Mary Poppins; Beauty And The Beast; **The 25th Annual Putnam County Spelling Bee**
Best Vocal Ensemble; Budget Category II	--- --- ---	--- --- ---	Elizabeth Forward; **Hampton**; Pittsburgh CAPA	Little Shop Of Horrors; **Into The Woods**; Hairspray
Best Vocal Ensemble; Budget Category III	--- --- ---	--- --- ---	Moon; North Hills; **Thomas Jefferson**	The Addams Family; Once Upon A Mattress; **Legally Blonde**
Best Vocal Ensemble; Budget Category IV	--- --- ---	--- --- ---	Pine-Richland; West Allegheny; **Woodland Hills**	Shrek; Legally Blonde; **Shrek**
Best Dance Ensemble; Budget Category I	--- --- ---	--- --- ---	Chartiers Valley; Plum; **Westinghouse Arts Academy**	Mary Poppins; The Addams Family; **The 25th Annual Putnam County Spelling Bee**
Best Dance Ensemble; Budget Category II	--- --- ---	--- --- ---	Elizabeth Forward; Hampton; **Pittsburgh CAPA**	Little Shop Of Horrors; Into The Woods; **Hairspray**
Best Dance Ensemble; Budget Category III	--- --- ---	--- --- ---	Moon; Riverview; **Thomas Jefferson**	The Addams Family; The Little Mermaid; **Legally Blonde**
Best Dance Ensemble; Budget Category IV	--- --- ---	--- --- ---	Pine-Richland; **West Allgeheny**; Woodland Hills	Shrek; **Legally Blonde**; Shrek
Best Crew/Technical Execution; Budget Category I	--- --- ---	--- --- ---	**Chartiers Valley**; Plum; Serra Catholic	**Mary Poppins**; The Addams Family; Beauty and the Beast
Best Crew/Technical Execution; Budget Category II	--- --- ---	--- --- ---	**Elizabeth Forward**; Hampton; Pittsburgh CAPA	**Little Shop Of Horrors**; Into The Woods; Hairspray
Best Crew/Technical Execution; Budget Category III	--- --- ---	--- --- ---	Moon; North Hills; **Thomas Jefferson**	The Addams Family; Once Upon A Mattress; **Legally Blonde**
Best Crew/Technical Execution; Budget Category IV	--- --- ---	--- --- ---	Pine-Richland; West Allegheny; **Woodland Hills**	Shrek; Legally Blonde; **Shrek**
Outstanding Student Artist	**Maddie Casella**; Stella Christensen; Jack Cipriani; Olivia Holloway; Alexander Victoria; Thomas Bellows, Lindsey Linsenbigler, Grace Moon, Jaide Moses	**Stage Manager**; Costume Designer; Advertising/Video; Student Director; Stage Manager; Dragon Puppeteers	**North Hills**; Quaker Valley; Moon; Avonworth; Pittsburgh CAPA; Woodland Hills	**Once Upon A Mattress**; The Little Mermaid; The Addams Family; The Mystery Of Edwin Drood; Hairspray; Shrek
Best Supporting Actor	Jack Cipriani; Andrew Kaehly; Isaac McCloy; Max Peluso; **Max Pratley**; Kai Sachon	Mel Beineke; Cinderella's Prince/Wolf; Leaf Coneybear; Hot Blades Harry; **Bud Frump**; Seaweed Stubbs	Moon; Hampton; Westinghouse Arts Academy; Sewickley Academy; **Baldwin**; Pittsburgh CAPA	The Addams Family; Into The Woods; The 25th Annual Putnam County Spelling Bee; Urinetown; **How To Succeed In Business Without Really Trying**; Hairspray
Best Supporting Actress	Camryn Hall; Mackenzie Heidenreich; Lucia Lazzara-Goodrich; Teddy McClelland; Beth Satariano; **Molly Virtue**	Rona Lisa Peretti; Enid Hoopes; Amber von Tussle; Dragon; Lady Larkin; **Fairy Godmother**	Westinghouse Arts Academy; West Allegheny; Pittsburgh CAPA; Woodland Hills; North Hills; **Pittsburgh Allderdice**	The 25th Annual Putnam County Spelling Bee; Legally Blonde; Hairspray; Shrek; Once Upon A Mattress; **Cinderella**
Best Actor	Dominic Difuccia; Jack Exline; **Tyler Guinto-Brody**; Logan Krushinski; Quintin Michalski; Nicolas Sperandeo	Shrek; Donkey; **Seymour Krelborn**; Shrek; J. Pierrepont Finch; Bert	Woodland Hills; Pine-Richland; **Elizabeth Forward**; Pine-Richland; Baldwin; Chartiers Valley	Shrek; Shrek; **Little Shop Of Horrors**; Shrek; How To Succeed In Business Without Really Trying; Mary Poppins
Best Actress	**Kylie Edwards**; Isabella Gricar; Trisha Holmes; Emma Hopf; Kaitlyn Majewski; Ellie Tongel	**Janet Van De Graaf**; Olive Ostrovsky; Fiona; Winnifred; Donna Sheridan; Morticia Addams	**Gateway**; Westinghouse Arts Academy; Pine-Richland; North Hills; McKeesport; Plum	**The Drowsy Chaperone**; The 25th Annual Putnam County Spelling Bee; Shrek; Once Upon A Mattress; Mamma Mia! The Addams Family
Best Musical; Budget Category I	--- --- ---	--- --- ---	Chartiers Valley; **Westinghouse Arts Academy**	Mary Poppins; **The 25th Annual Putnam County Spelling Bee**
Best Musical; Budget Category II	--- --- ---	--- --- ---	Elizabeth Forward; **Hampton**	Little Shop Of Horrors; **Into The Woods**
Best Musical; Budget Category III	--- --- ---	--- --- ---	North Hills; **Thomas Jefferson**	Once Upon A Mattress; **Legally Blonde**
Best Musical; Budget Category IV	--- --- ---	--- --- ---	West Allegheny; **Woodland Hills**	Legally Blonde; **Shrek**

=== 2021 nominees and winners ===
Category	Nominee	School
Best Supporting Actor	Broedy Geary; **Desmon Jackson**; Matthew Luckiewicz; Maxwell Pratley; Dennis Thompson; Victor Williams	Westinghouse Arts Academy; **Woodland Hills**; Central/Oakland Catholic; Baldwin'; Woodland Hills; Pine-Richland
Best Supporting Actress	Elaine Gombos; Isabella Gricar; Katarina Hudock; Leah McConnell; Jay Puff; **Ellie Tongel**	Shady Side Academy; Westinghouse Arts Academy; Pine-Richland; Hampton; Baldwin; **Plum**
Best Actor	Tyler Dumas; **Tyler Guinto-Brody**; Zach Kautter; Logan Krushinski; Jonathan Parker'; Caedon Vogel	North Hills; **Elizabeth Forward**; Central/Oakland Catholic; Pine-Richland; Westinghouse Arts Academy; Elizabeth Forward
Best Actress	Gracie Campbell; Georgia Dale; Angelina Guadalupe; **Audrey Logan**; Ellie Troiani; Madison Vogel	West Allegheny; Springdale; Elizabeth Forward; **South Fayette**; Our Lady of the Sacred Heart; Penn Hills

=== 2019 nominees and winners ===
Category	Nominee	Role	School	Musical
Best Scenic Design; Budget Category I	--- --- ---	--- --- ---	**Deer Lakes**; Our Lady of the Sacred Heart; Propel Braddock Hills	**Mamma Mia!** Once Upon a Mattress; Once On This Island
Best Scenic Design; Budget Category II	--- --- ---	--- --- ---	**Elizabeth Forward**; Moon; North Hills	**Mamma Mia!** Mamma Mia! Tuck Everlasting
Best Scenic Design; Budget Category III	--- --- ---	--- --- ---	Baldwin; West Allegheny; **Woodland Hills**	Mame; The Addams Family; **Mamma Mia!**
Best Costume Design; Budget Category I	--- --- ---	--- --- ---	**Our Lady of the Sacred Heart**; Seton-LaSalle; St. Joseph	**Once Upon A Mattress**; Joseph and the Amazing Technicolor Dreamcoat; In The Heights
Best Costume Design; Budget Category II	--- --- ---	--- --- ---	**Avonworth**; Elizabeth Forward; Hampton	**Disney's The Little Mermaid**; Mamma Mia! Chicago
Best Costume Design; Budget Category III	--- --- ---	--- --- ---	**Penn Hills**; West Allegheny; Woodland Hills	**The Addams Family**; The Addams Family; Mamma Mia!
Best Lighting Design; Budget Category I	--- --- ---	--- --- ---	Our Lady of the Sacred Heart; **Propel Braddock Hills**; Seton-LaSalle	Once Upon A Mattress; **Once On This Island**; Joseph and the Amazing Technicolor Dreamcoat
Best Lighting Design; Budget Category II	--- --- ---	--- --- ---	Chartiers Valley; Hampton; **Moon**	Sister Act; Chicago; **Mamma Mia!**
Best Lighting Design; Budget Category III	--- --- ---	--- --- ---	Penn Hills; Pine-Richland; **Woodland Hills**	The Addams Family; Guys and Dolls; **Mamma Mia!**
Best All-Student Orchestra	--- --- --- --- --- ---	--- --- --- --- --- ---	Hampton; North Hills; Pine-Richland; Pittsburgh Allderdice; **Pittsburgh CAPA**; Westinghouse Arts Academy	Chicago; Tuck Everlasting; Guys and Dolls; Leader of the Pack; **Sister Act**; Footloose
Best Ensemble	--- --- --- --- --- ---	--- --- --- --- --- ---	Elizabeth Forward; Moon; Penn Hills; **West Allegheny**; Westinghouse Arts Academy; Woodland Hills	Mamma Mia! Mamma Mia! The Addams Family; **The Addams Family**; Footloose; Mamma Mia!
Best Crew/ Technical Execution	--- --- --- --- --- ---	--- --- --- --- --- ---	Elizabeth Forward; Moon; North Hills; Our Lady of Sacred Heart; Westinghouse Arts Academy; **Woodland Hills**	Mamma Mia! Mamma Mia! Tuck Everlasting; Once Upona Mattress; Footloose; **Mamma Mia!**
Best Execution of Choreography	--- --- --- --- --- ---	--- --- --- --- --- ---	Central/Oakland Catholic; **Elizabeth Forward**; North Hills; Westinghouse Arts Academy; West Allegheny; Woodland Hills	Chicago; **Mamma Mia!** Tuck Everlasting; Footloose; The Addams Family; Mamma Mia!
Best Execution of Direction	--- --- --- --- --- ---	--- --- --- --- --- ---	**Elizabeth Forward**; Moon; North Hills; Penn Hills; West Allegheny; Woodland Hills	**Mamma Mia!** Mamma Mia! Tuck Everlasting; The Addams Family; The Addams Family; Mamma Mia!
Best Execution of Music Direction	--- --- --- --- --- ---	--- --- --- --- --- ---	**Elizabeth Forward**; Moon; North Hills; Penn Hills; West Allegheny; Woodland Hills	**Mamma Mia!** Mamma Mia! Tuck Everlasting; The Addams Family; The Addams Family; Mamma Mia!
Best Supporting Actor	Declan Allwein; Harrison Bash; Tyler Dumas; **Samuel Kagle**; Noah Kendall; Austin Peters	Nicely-Nicely Johnson; Fester Addams; Hugo; **Eddie Souther**; Willard Hewitt; Mr. Mushnik	Pine-Richland; Penn Hills; North Hills; **Chartiers Valley**; Montour; Pittsburgh Brashear	Guys and Dolls; The Addams Family; Tuck Everlasting; **Sister Act**; Footloose; Little Shop of Horrors
Best Supporting Actress	Angelina Guadalupe; Olivia Jesse; Angel Palladini; **Rhiannon Passmore**; Lindsey Sabo; Kaylee Skumburdes	Rosie Mulligan; Daniela; Dragon; **Sr. Mary Lazarus**; Alice Beineke; Sr. Mary Patrick	Elizabeth Forward; St. Joseph; Quaker Valley; **Pittsburgh CAPA**; West Allegheny; Chartiers Valley	Mamma Mia! In The Heights; Shrek The Musical; **Sister Act**; The Addams Family; Sister Act
Best Actor	Eric Dickey; Trent Edwards; Joseph Fish; James Fedor; **Tyler Hepler**; Preston Proctor	Beast; Ren McCormack; Billy Flynn; Scarecrow; **Sky Masterson**; Shrek	Sewickley Academy; Westinghouse Arts Academy; Hampton; Serra Catholic; **Pine-Richland**; Riverview	Beauty and the Beast; Footloose; Chicago; The Wizard of Oz; **Guys and Dolls**; Shrek The Musical
Best Actress	Alyssa Brinza; Amariana Busa; Diana Craycroft; Annie Mihm; Ruby Sevcik; **Morgan Traud**	Princess Winnifred; Miss Adelaide; Maria; Roxie Hart; Fiona; **Mame Dennis**	Our Lady of the Sacred Heart; Pine-Richland; Steel Valley; Central/Oakland Catholic; Quaker Valley; **Baldwin**	Once Upon A Mattress; Guys and Dolls; The Sound of Music; Chicago; Shrek The Musical; **Mame**
Best Musical; Budget Category I	--- --- ---	--- --- ---	**Our Lady of the Sacred Heart**; Propel Braddock Hills; Westinghouse Arts Academy	**Once Upon A Mattress**; Once On This Island; Footloose
Best Musical; Budget Category II	--- --- ---	--- --- ---	**Elizabeth Forward**; Moon; North Hills	**Mamma Mia!** Mamma Mia! Tuck Everlasting
Best Musical; Budget Category III	--- --- ---	--- --- ---	Penn Hills; West Allegheny; **Woodland Hills**	The Addams Family; The Addams Family; **Mamma Mia!**

=== 2018 nominees and winners ===
Category	Nominee	Role	School	Musical
Best Scenic Design; Budget Category I	--- --- ---	--- --- ---	**Redeemer Lutheran**; Sewickley Academy; St. Joseph	**Beauty and the Beast**; The Sound of Music; Children of Eden
Best Scenic Design; Budget Category II	--- --- ---	--- --- ---	Elizabeth Forward; **Pittsburgh CAPA**; Plum	Legally Blonde; **Les Misérables**; Annie
Best Scenic Design; Budget Category III	--- --- ---	--- --- ---	Baldwin; West Allegheny; **Woodland Hills**	Thoroughly Modern Millie; The Drowsy Chaperone; **The Drowsy Chaperone**
Best Costume Design; Budget Category I	--- --- ---	--- --- ---	Deer Lakes; **Redeemer Lutheran**; St. Joseph	The Little Mermaid; **Beauty and the Beast**; Children of Eden
Best Costume Design; Budget Category II	--- --- ---	--- --- ---	Elizabeth Forward; **Hampton**; Pittsburgh CAPA	Legally Blonde; **Nice Work If You Can Get It**; Les Miserables
Best Costume Design; Budget Category III	--- --- ---	--- --- ---	Avonworth; West Allegheny; **Woodland Hills**	1776; The Drowsy Chaperone; **The Drowsy Chaperone**
Best Lighting Design; Budget Category I	--- --- ---	--- --- ---	Pittsburgh Allderdice; Propel Braddock Hills; **St. Joseph**	The Addams Family; Shrek the Musical; **Children of Eden**
Best Lighting Design; Budget Category II	--- --- ---	--- --- ---	Elizabeth Forward; Hampton; **Pittsburgh CAPA**	Legally Blonde; Nice Work If You Can Get It; **Les Misérables**
Best Lighting Design; Budget Category III	--- --- ---	--- --- ---	Baldwin; West Allegheny; **Woodland Hills**	Honeymoon In Vegas; The Drowsy Chaperone; **The Drowsy Chaperone**
Best All-Student Orchestra	--- --- --- --- --- ---	--- --- --- --- --- ---	Hampton; Pine-Richland; Pittsburgh Allderdice; **Pittsburgh CAPA**; Plum; Sewickley Academy	Nice Work If You Can Get It; Oklahoma; The Addams Family; **Les Misérables**; Annie; The Sound of Music
Best Ensemble	--- --- --- --- --- ---	--- --- --- --- --- ---	Elizabeth Forward; **Hampton**; Pine-Richland; Pittsburgh CAPA; Plum; Woodland Hills	Legally Blonde; **Nice Work If You Can Get It**; Oklahoma; Les Miserables; Annie; The Drowsy Chaperone
Best Crew/ Technical Execution	--- --- --- --- --- ---	--- --- --- --- --- ---	Chartiers Valley; **Elizabeth Forward**; Pittsburgh CAPA; Plum; West Allegheny; Woodland Hills	Legally Blonde; **Legally Blonde**; Les Miserables; Annie; The Drowsy Chaperone; The Drowsy Chaperone
Best Execution of Choreography	--- --- --- --- --- ---	--- --- --- --- --- ---	Central/Oakland Catholic; Elizabeth Forward; **Hampton**; Pittsburgh CAPA; Plum; West Allegheny; Woodland Hills	A Chorus Line; Legally Blonde; **Nice Work If You Can Get It**; Les Miserables; Annie; The Drowsy Chaperone; The Drowsy Chaperone
Best Execution of Direction	--- --- --- --- --- ---	--- --- --- --- --- ---	Elizabeth Forward; Hampton; Pittsburgh CAPA; Plum; West Allegheny; **Woodland Hills**	Legally Blonde; Nice Work If You Can Get It; Les Miserables; Annie; The Drowsy Chaperone; **The Drowsy Chaperone**
Best Execution of Music Direction	--- --- --- --- --- ---	--- --- --- --- --- ---	Elizabeth Forward; **Hampton**; Pine-Richland; Pittsburgh CAPA; Redeemer Lutheran; Woodland Hills	Legally Blonde; **Nice Work If You Can Get It**; Oklahoma; Les Miserables; Beauty and the Beast; The Drowsy Chaperone
Best Supporting Actor	**Joseph Fish**; Peter J. Kelly Stamerra; AJ Prestogeorge; Preston Proctor; Matthew Thornton; Kevin Tinsley	**Cookie McGee**; Bela Zangler; Adolpho; Sir Dennis Galahad; Callahan; Robert Martin	**Hampton**; Westingouse Arts Academy; Woodland Hills; Riverview; Chartiers Valley; Woodland Hills	**Nice Work If You Can Get It**; Crazy For You; The Drowsy Chaperone; Spamalot; Legally Blonde; The Drowsy Chaperone
Best Supporting Actress	Katie Carlson; Jane Fusco; Angelina Guadalupe; Liza Loebig; Elena Orban; **Jenna Yezovich**	Edward Rutledge; Joan; Enid; Miss Hannigan; Eileen Evergreen; **The Drowsy Chaperone**	Avonworth; North Hills; Elizabeth Forward; Plum; Hampton; **Woodland Hills**	1776; Dames At Sea; Legally Blonde; Annie; Nice Work If You Can Get It; **The Drowsy Chaperone**
Best Actor	Tyler Anderson; Michael Brawdy; **Nasir Butler**; Tyler Hepler; Matthew Hommel; Robbie Miller	Jimmy Winter; Man In Chair; **Jean Valjean**; Will Parker; Bobby Child; Jack Singer	Hampton; Woodland Hills; **Pittsburgh CAPA**; Pine-Richland; Westinghouse Arts Academy; Baldwin	Nice Work If You Can Get It; The Drowsy Chaperone; **Les Misérables**; Oklahoma; Crazy For You; Honeymoon In Vegas
Best Actress	Chelsea Calfo; Sydney Campbell; Theresa Hall; **Johanna Loughran**; Zoey Myers; Jenna Wood	Cosette; Janet Van de Graff; Elle Woods; **Cassie**; Eponine; Elle Woods	Pittsburgh CAPA; West Allegheny; Elizabeth Forward; **Central/Oakland Catholic**; Pittsburgh CAPA; Chartiers Valley	Les Miserables; The Drowsy Chaperone; Legally Blonde; **A Chorus Line**; Les Miserables; Legally Blonde
Best Musical; Budget Category I	--- --- ---	--- --- ---	Pittsburgh Allderdice; **Redeemer Lutheran**; Sewickley Academy	The Addams Family; **Beauty and the Beast**; The Sound of Music
Best Musical; Budget Category II	--- --- ---	--- --- ---	Elizabeth Forward; Hampton; **Pittsburgh CAPA**	Legally Blonde; Nice Work If You Can Get It; **Les Misérables**
Best Musical; Budget Category III	--- --- ---	--- --- ---	Pine-Richland; West Allegheny; **Woodland Hills**	Oklahoma; The Drowsy Chaperone; **The Drowsy Chaperone**

=== 2017 nominees and winners ===
Category	Nominee	Role	School	Musical
Best Scenic Design; Budget Category I	--- --- ---	--- --- ---	Pittsburgh CAPA; Pittsburgh Barack Obama Academy; **Pittsburgh Perry**	Anything Goes; Sister Act; **You're A Good Man, Charlie Brown**
Best Scenic Design; Budget Category II	--- --- ---	--- --- ---	Central Catholic; Elizabeth Forward; **Hampton**	In The Heights; Anything Goes; **Big Fish**
Best Scenic Design; Budget Category III	--- --- ---	--- --- ---	West Allegheny; West Mifflin; **Woodland Hills**	Thoroughly Modern Millie; Anything Goes; **Monty Python's Spamalot**
Best Costume Design; Budget Category I	--- --- ---	--- --- ---	Deer Lakes; Pittsburgh Barack Obama Academy; **St. Joseph**	Little Shop Of Horrors; Sister Act; **Hello Dolly!**
Best Costume Design; Budget Category II	--- --- ---	--- --- ---	Elizabeth Forward; **Hampton**; Quaker Valley	Anything Goes; **Big Fish**; The Sound of Plaid
Best Costume Design; Budget Category III	--- --- ---	--- --- ---	Baldwin; **West Allegheny**; Woodland Hills	Zorro: The Musical; **Thoroughly Modern Millie**; Monty Python’s Spamalot
Best Lighting Design; Budget Category I	--- --- ---	--- --- ---	**Deer Lakes**; Our Lady of the Sacred Heart; St. Joseph	**Little Shop Of Horrors**; Footloose; Hello, Dolly!
Best Lighting Design; Budget Category II	--- --- ---	--- --- ---	Central Catholic; **Hampton**; Keystone Oaks	In The Heights; **Big Fish**; Footloose
Best Lighting Design; Budget Category III	--- --- ---	--- --- ---	Baldwin; West Allegheny; **Woodland Hills**	Zorro; Thoroughly Modern Millie; **Monty Python's Spamalot**
Best All-Student Orchestra	--- --- --- --- --- ---	--- --- --- --- --- ---	Baldwin; **Hampton**; North Hills; Pine Richland; Pittsburgh Allderdice; Pittsburgh CAPA	Zorro; **Big Fish**; Me and My Girl; Joseph and The Amazing Technicolor Dreamcoat; Pippin; Anything Goes
Best Ensemble	--- --- --- --- --- ---	--- --- --- --- --- ---	Baldwin; **Central Catholic**; Hampton; Pittsburgh Barack Obama; Quaker Valley; West Allegheny	Zorro: The Musical; **In The Heights**; Big Fish; Sister Act; The Sound of Plaid; Thoroughly Modern Millie
Best Crew/ Technical Execution	--- --- --- --- --- ---	--- --- --- --- --- ---	Baldwin; Central Catholic; Elizabeth Forward; **Hampton**; West Allegheny; Woodland Hills	Zorro: The Musical; In The Heights; Anything Goes; **Big Fish**; Thoroughly Modern Millie; Monty Python’s Spamalot
Best Execution of Choreography	--- --- --- --- --- ---	--- --- --- --- --- ---	Baldwin; Central Catholic; Hampton; Pittsburgh Barack Obama Academy; **West Allegheny**; Woodland Hills	Zorro: The Musical; In The Heights; Big Fish; Sister Act; **Thoroughly Modern Millie**; Monty Python's Spamalot
Best Execution of Direction	--- --- --- --- --- ---	--- --- --- --- --- ---	**Baldwin**; Central Catholic; Hampton; Pittsburgh Barack Obama Academy; West Allegheny; Woodland Hills	**Zorro: The Musical**; In The Heights; Big Fish; Sister Act; Thoroughly Modern Millie; Monty Python’s Spamalot
Best Execution of Music Direction	--- --- --- --- --- ---	--- --- --- --- --- ---	**Baldwin**; Central Catholic; Hampton; Pine Richland; Pittsburgh CAPA; Woodland Hills	**Zorro: The Musical**; In The Heights; Big Fish; Joseph and the Amazing Technicolor Dreamcoat; Anything Goes; Monty Python's Spamalot
Best Supporting Actor	**Robert Carr**; Samuel Kagle; Zac McDowell; Anders Ove; Ethan Reed; Sam Shadle	**Sir Dennis Galahad**; Beadle Bamford; Lefou; Lumiere; Eddie Souther; Horace Vandergelder	**Woodland Hills**; Chartiers Valley; Avonworth; Avonworth; Pittsburgh Barack Obama Academy; St. Joseph	**Monty Python's Spamalot**; Sweeney Todd; Disney's Beauty & the Beast; Disney's Beauty and the Beast; Sister Act; Hello, Dolly
Best Supporting Actress	**Emma Sue Ewing**; Alayia Logan; Marissa Randall; Christina Trocchio; Jenna Woods; Katherine Zemaitis	**Erma Latour**; Sister Mary Lazarus; Sister Mary Patrick; Rusty; Beggar Woman; Inez the Gypsy	**Pittsburgh CAPA**; Pittsburgh Barack Obama Academy; Pittsburgh Barack Obama Academy; Our Lady of the Sacred Heart; Chartiers Valley; Baldwin	**Anything Goes**; Sister Act; Sister Act; Footloose; Sweeney Todd; Zorro: The Musical
Best Actor	Nick Cortazzo; Tim Dougherty; William Huffmyer; Devin Moore; **Jake Pedersen**; Adam Walker	Zorro; Benny; Bill Snibson; Sweeney Todd; **Joseph**; Sky Masterson	Baldwin; Central Catholic; North Hills; Chartiers Valley; **Pine Richland**; Riverview	Zorro: The Musical; In The Heights; Me and My Girl; Sweeney Todd; **Joseph and the Amazing Technicolor Dreamcoat**; Guys and Dolls
Best Actress	Chelsea Calfo; Theresa Hall; **Chloe Rae Kehm**; Meredith Kocur; Paige Nelson; Morgan Traud	Reno Sweeney; Reno Sweeney; **Millie Dillmount**; Sarah Brown; Narrator; Luisa Pulido	Pittsburgh CAPA; Elizabeth Forward; **West Allegheny**; Riverview; Pine Richland; Baldwin	Anything Goes; Anything Goes; **Thoroughly Modern Millie**; Guys and Dolls; Joseph and the Amazing Technicolor Dreamcoat; Zorro: The Musical
Best Musical; Budget Category I	--- --- ---	--- --- ---	Our Lady of the Sacred Heart; **Pittsburgh Barack Obama Academy**; St. Joseph	Footloose; **Sister Act**; Hello, Dolly!
Best Musical; Budget Category II	--- --- ---	--- --- ---	Central Catholic; Elizabeth Forward; **Hampton**	In The Heights; Anything Goes; **Big Fish**
Best Musical; Budget Category III	--- --- ---	--- --- ---	**Baldwin**; West Allegheny; Woodland Hills	**Zorro: The Musical**; Thoroughly Modern Millie; Monty Python’s Spamalot

=== 2016 nominees and winners ===
Category	Nominee	Role	School	Musical
Best Scenic Design; Budget Category I	--- --- ---	--- --- ---	Our Lady of the Sacred Heart; **Pittsburgh CAPA**; St. Joseph	Thoroughly Modern Millie; **West Side Story**; Les Miserables
Best Scenic Design; Budget Category II	--- --- ---	--- --- ---	Avonworth; **Chartiers Valley**; Elizabeth Forward	Into The Woods; **Les Misérables**; 9 to 5
Best Scenic Design; Budget Category III	--- --- ---	--- --- ---	Baldwin; Pine Richland; **Woodland Hills**	Big Fish; The Music Man; **Peter Pan**
Best Costume Design; Budget Category I	--- --- ---	--- --- ---	Our Lady of the Sacred Heart; **Pittsburgh CAPA**; St. Joseph	Thoroughly Modern Millie; West Side Story; Les Miserables
Best Costume Design; Budget Category II	--- --- ---	--- --- ---	Avonworth; Chartiers Valley; **Hampton**	Into The Woods; Les Miserables; **Monty Python's Spamalot**
Best Costume Design; Budget Category III	--- --- ---	--- --- ---	Baldwin; Pine Richland; **Woodland Hills**	Big Fish; The Music Man; **Peter Pan**
Best Lighting Design; Budget Category I	--- --- ---	--- --- ---	Our Lady of the Sacred Heart; **Pittsburgh CAPA**; St. Joseph	Thoroughly Modern Millie; **West Side Story**; Les Miserables
Best Lighting Design; Budget Category II	--- --- ---	--- --- ---	Avonworth; **Chartiers Valley**; Quaker Valley	Into The Woods; **Les Misérables**; 9 to 5
Best Lighting Design; Budget Category III	--- --- ---	--- --- ---	Baldwin; Pine Richland; **Woodland Hills**	Big Fish; The Music Man; **Peter Pan**
Best All-Student Orchestra	--- --- --- --- --- ---	--- --- --- --- --- ---	Baldwin; Deer Lakes; Hampton; North Hills; Pittsburgh Barack Obama; **Pittsburgh CAPA**	Big Fish; Grease; Monty Python's Spamalot; Cinderella; 9 to 5; **West Side Story**
Best Ensemble	--- --- --- --- --- ---	--- --- --- --- --- ---	Avonworth; Baldwin; Chartiers Valley; Pittsburgh Barack Obama; **Pittsburgh CAPA**; Quaker Valley	Into The Woods; Big Fish; Les Miserables; 9 to 5; **West Side Story**; 9 to 5
Best Crew/ Technical Execution	--- --- --- --- --- ---	--- --- --- --- --- ---	Avonworth; Baldwin; Chartiers Valley; Elizabeth Forward; North Hills; **Woodland Hills**	Into The Woods; Big Fish; Les Miserables; 9 to 5 Cinderella; **Peter Pan**
Best Execution of Choreography	--- --- --- --- --- ---	--- --- --- --- --- ---	Avonworth; Baldwin; Central Catholic; Chartiers Valley; **Pittsburgh CAPA**; Woodland Hills	Into The Woods; Big Fish; Fame; Les Miserables; **West Side Story**; Peter Pan
Best Execution of Direction	--- --- --- --- --- ---	--- --- --- --- --- ---	Avonworth; Baldwin; Chartiers Valley; North Hills; Pine Richland; **Pittsburgh CAPA**	Into The Woods; Big Fish; Les Miserables; Cinderella; The Music Man; **West Side Story**
Best Execution of Music Direction	--- --- --- --- --- ---	--- --- --- --- --- ---	Avonworth; Baldwin; Chartiers Valley; North Hills; Pine Richland; **Pittsburgh CAPA**	Into The Woods; Big Fish; Les Miserables; Cinderella; The Music Man; **West Side Story**
Best Supporting Actor	Anthony Giancola; Lance Joos; Keaton Runco; Logan Shiller; Noah Skowron; **Alexander Wood**	Enjorlas; Action; Smee; Chino; Zach; **Sir Dennis Galahad/Prince Herbert**	St. Joseph; Pittsburgh CAPA; Woodland Hills; Pittsburgh CAPA; West Allegheny; **Hampton**	Les Miserables; West Side Story; Peter Pan; West Side Story; A Chorus Line; **Monty Python's Spamalot**
Best Supporting Actress	Tessa Douglas; Jayme Kefalas; Meredith Kocur; Elizabeth Manuel; **Ariel Squire**; Maura Ward	Tiger Lilly; Madame Thenadier; Beth; Roz Keith; **Rosalia**; Miss Sherman	Woodland Hills; St. Joseph; Riverview; Quaker Valley; **Pittsburgh CAPA**; Central Catholic	Peter Pan; Les Miserables; Little Women; 9 to 5; **West Side Story**; Fame
Best Actor	Dustin Butoryak; Nick Cortazzo; Jakob Hayes; Rush Hodgin; **Devin Moore**; Paul Watt-Morse	Tony; Edward Bloom; Javert; Harold Hill; **Jean Valjean**; Riff	Pittsburgh CAPA; Baldwin; St. Joseph; Pine Richland; **Chartiers Valley**; Pittsburgh CAPA	West Side Story; Big Fish; Les Misérables; The Music Man; **Les Misérables**; West Side Story
Best Actress	Bryce Chisom; Elexa Hanner; Maddie Kocur; Leah Prestogeorge; **Marnie Quick**; Malynne Smith	Judy Bernley; Anita; Jo March; Peter Pan; **Doralee Rhodes**; Maria	Pittsburgh Barack Obama Academy; Pittsburgh CAPA; Riverview; Woodland Hills; **Pittsburgh Barack Obama Academy**; Pittsburgh CAPA	9 to 5 West Side Story; Little Women; Peter Pan; **9 to 5** West Side Story
Best Musical; Budget Category I	--- --- ---	--- --- ---	Our Lady of the Sacred Heart; **Pittsburgh CAPA**; St. Joseph	Thoroughly Modern Millie; **West Side Story**; Les Miserables
Best Musical; Budget Category II	--- --- ---	--- --- ---	Avonworth; **Chartiers Valley**; Hampton	Into The Woods; **Les Misérables**; Monty Python's Spamalot
Best Musical; Budget Category III	--- --- ---	--- --- ---	**Baldwin**; Pine Richland; Woodland Hills	**Big Fish**; The Music Man; Peter Pan

=== 2015 nominees and winners ===
Category	Nominee	Role	School	Musical
Best Scenic Design; Budget Category I	--- --- ---	--- --- ---	**Pittsburgh Barack Obama**; Pittsburgh CAPA; Pittsburgh Perry	**SHOUT! The Mod Musical**; Aida; Annie
Best Scenic Design; Budget Category II	--- --- ---	--- --- ---	**Northgate**; Plum; Quaker Valley	**Mary Poppins**; Shrek the Musical; The Drowsy Chaperone
Best Scenic Design; Budget Category III	--- --- ---	--- --- ---	Baldwin; Elizabeth Forward; **Woodland Hills**	The Drowsy Chaperone; Mary Poppins; **The Mystery of Edwin Drood**
Best Costume Design; Budget Category I	--- --- ---	--- --- ---	**Our Lady of the Sacred Heart**; Pittsburgh Barack Obama; Pittsburgh CAPA	**The Addams Family**; SHOUT! The Mod Musical; Aida
Best Costume Design; Budget Category II	--- --- ---	--- --- ---	**Plum**; Quaker Valley; Riverview	**Shrek the Musical**; The Drowsy Chaperone; The Addams Family
Best Costume Design; Budget Category III	--- --- ---	--- --- ---	Elizabeth Forward; Hampton; **Woodland Hills**	Mary Poppins; The Addams Family; **The Mystery Of Edwin Drood**
Best Lighting Design; Budget Category I	--- --- ---	--- --- ---	Pittsburgh Barack Obama; **Pittsburgh CAPA**; Our Lady of the Sacred Heart	SHOUT! The Mod Musical; **Aida**; The Addams Family
Best Lighting Design; Budget Category II	--- --- ---	--- --- ---	North Hills; **Plum**; Quaker Valley	Footloose; **Shrek the Musical**; The Drowsy Chaperone
Best Lighting Design; Budget Category III	--- --- ---	--- --- ---	**Elizabeth Forward**; West Allegheny; Woodland Hills	**Mary Poppins**; Chicago; The Mystery Of Edwin Drood
Best All-Student Orchestra	--- --- --- --- --- ---	--- --- --- --- --- ---	Baldwin; Hampton; Pittsburgh Allderdice; **Pittsburgh Barack Obama**; Pittsburgh CAPA; West Mifflin	The Drowsy Chaperone; The Addams Family; How To Succeed... **SHOUT! The Mod Musical**; Aida; Shrek the Musical
Best Ensemble	--- --- --- --- --- ---	--- --- --- --- --- ---	Baldwin; North Hills; Pittsburgh Barack Obama; Pittsburgh CAPA; Plum; **Woodland Hills**	The Drowsy Chaperone; Footloose; SHOUT! The Mod Musical; Aida; Shrek the Musical; **The Mystery Of Edwin Drood**
Best Crew/ Technical Execution	--- --- --- --- --- ---	--- --- --- --- --- ---	Baldwin; North Hills; Pittsburgh CAPA; Quaker Valley; West Allegheny; **Woodland Hills**	The Drowsy Chaperone; Footloose; Aida; The Drowsy Chaperone; Chicago; **The Mystery Of Edwin Drood**
Best Execution of Choreography	--- --- --- --- --- ---	--- --- --- --- --- ---	Baldwin; North Hills; **Pittsburgh Barack Obama**; Pittsburgh CAPA; Plum; West Allegheny	The Drowsy Chaperone; Footloose; **SHOUT! The Mod Musical**; Aida; Shrek the Musical; Chicago
Best Execution of Direction	--- --- --- --- --- ---	--- --- --- --- --- ---	Baldwin; Pittsburgh Barack Obama; Plum; Quaker Valley; West Allegheny; **Woodland Hills**	The Drowsy Chaperone; SHOUT! The Mod Musical; Shrek the Musical; The Drowsy Chaperone; Chicago; **The Mystery Of Edwin Drood**
Best Execution of Music Direction	--- --- --- --- --- ---	--- --- --- --- --- ---	Baldwin; North Hills; **Pittsburgh Barack Obama**; Plum; West Allegheny; Woodland Hills	The Drowsy Chaperone; Footloose; **SHOUT! The Mod Musical**; Shrek the Musical; Chicago; The Mystery Of Edwin Drood
Best Supporting Actor	Gavin Carnahan; Alexander Conte; Peter Heres; Mitchell McDermott; **Robert Miller**; Dan Schall	Telly/Gavin; Moonface Martin; Man In Chair; Lumiere; **Man In Chair**; Pontius Pilate	Bishop Canevin; Springdale; Quaker Valley; Chartiers Valley; **Baldwin**; St. Joseph	Godspell; Anything Goes; The Drowsy Chaperone; Beauty and the Beast; **The Drowsy Chaperone**; Jesus Christ Superstar
Best Supporting Actress	Erin Daly; Susie George; Campbell Kurlander; **Samantha Selleck**; Christina Trocchio; Erin Witt	Alice Beineke; Celisse/Susie; Smitty; **Mrs. Tottendale**; Pugsley Addams; Science Officer	Hampton; Bishop Canevin; Pittsburgh Allderdice; **Quaker Valley**; Our Lady of the Sacred Heart; Keystone Oaks	The Addams Family; Godspell; How To Succeed... **The Drowsy Chaperone**; The Addams Family; Return To The Forbidden Planet
Best Actor	Justin McCord; **Larry McKay**; Noah Pepmeyer; Adam Rayan; Logan Smith; Terry Terhune	John Jasper/Mr. Clive Paget; **J. Pierrepont Finch**; Ren McCormack; Jonas Nightingale; Shrek; Lord Farquaad	Woodland Hills; **Pittsburgh Allderdice**; North Hills; Penn Hills; Plum; Plum	The Mystery Of Edwin Drood; **How To Succeed...** Footloose; Leap Of Faith; Shrek the Musical; Shrek The Musical
Best Actress	Emily Matisko; Leah Prestogeorge; **Marnie Quick**; Maria Scherer; Kaylie Wallace; Danielle Wolfson	Princess Fiona; Edwin Drood/Miss Alice Nutting; **Orange Girl**; Wednesday Adams; Roxie Hart; Janet Van De Graaf	Plum; Woodland Hills; **Pittsburgh Barack Obama Academy**; Hampton; West Allegheny; Baldwin	Shrek The Musical; The Mystery Of Edwin Drood; **SHOUT! The Mod Musical**; The Addams Family; Chicago; The Drowsy Chaperone
Best Musical; Budget Category I	--- --- ---	--- --- ---	Our Lady of the Sacred Heart; **Pittsburgh Barack Obama Academy**; Pittsburgh CAPA	The Addams Family; **SHOUT! The Mod Musical**; Aida
Best Musical; Budget Category II	--- --- ---	--- --- ---	North Hills; **Plum**; Quaker Valley	Footloose; **Shrek The Musical**; The Drowsy Chaperone
Best Musical; Budget Category III	--- --- ---	--- --- ---	Baldwin; West Allegheny; **Woodland Hills**	The Drowsy Chaperone; Chicago; **The Mystery Of Edwin Drood**

=== 2014 nominees and winners ===
Category	Nominee	Role	School	Musical
Best Scenic Design; Budget Category I	--- --- ---	--- --- ---	**Our Lady of the Sacred Heart**; Pittsburgh Perry; St. Joseph	**The Wiz**; Seussical; Shrek the Musical
Best Scenic Design; Budget Category II	--- --- ---	--- --- ---	Central Catholic; **Hampton**; Riverview	Monty Python's Spamalot; **Young Frankenstein**; Fiddler on the Roof
Best Scenic Design; Budget Category III	--- --- ---	--- --- ---	Pine-Richland; West Allegheny; **Woodland Hills**	Thoroughly Modern Millie; Catch Me If You Can; **Sweeney Todd**
Best Costume Design; Budget Category I	--- --- ---	--- --- ---	Our Lady of the Sacred Heart; Quaker Valley; **St. Joseph**	The Wiz; Pirates of Penzance; **Shrek the Musical**
Best Costume Design; Budget Category II	--- --- ---	--- --- ---	Bishop Canevin; **Central Catholic**; Hampton	The Drowsy Chaperone; **Monty Python's Spamalot**; Young Frankenstein
Best Costume Design; Budget Category III	--- --- ---	--- --- ---	**Baldwin**; Pine-Richland; Woodland Hills	**Shrek the Musical**; Thoroughly Modern Millie; Sweeney Todd
Best Lighting Design; Budget Category I	--- --- ---	--- --- ---	**Our Lady of the Sacred Heart**; Pittsburgh CAPA; St. Joseph	**The Wiz**; Footloose; Shrek, The Musical
Best Lighting Design; Budget Category II	--- --- ---	--- --- ---	Central Catholic; Hampton; **Riverview**	Monty Python's Spamalot; Young Frankenstein; **Fiddler on the Roof**
Best Lighting Design; Budget Category III	--- --- ---	--- --- ---	Avonworth; West Allegheny; **Woodland Hills**	Man of La Mancha; Catch Me If You Can; **Sweeney Todd**
Best All-Student Orchestra	--- --- --- --- --- ---	--- --- --- --- --- ---	Baldwin; **Hampton**; North Hills; Pittsburgh Barack Obama Academy; Pittsburgh CAPA; West Mifflin	Shrek the Musical; **Young Frankenstein**; 42nd Street; The Wiz; Footloose; Bye Bye Birdie
Best Choreography	--- --- --- --- --- ---	--- --- --- --- --- ---	Central Catholic; **Hampton**; Pine-Richland; Pittsburgh Barack Obama; Pittsburgh CAPA; West Allegheny	Monty Python's Spamalot; **Young Frankenstein**; Thoroughly Modern Millie; The Wiz; Footloose; Catch Me If You Can
Best Crew/ Technical Execution	--- --- --- --- --- ---	--- --- --- --- --- ---	Baldwin; Hampton; **Pine-Richland**; Pittsburgh Barack Obama Academy; Riverview; Woodland Hills	Shrek the Musical; Young Frankenstein; **Thoroughly Modern Millie**; The Wiz; Fiddler On The Roof; Sweeney Todd
Best Ensemble	--- --- --- --- --- ---	--- --- --- --- --- ---	Central Catholic; **Hampton**; Pittsburgh Barack Obama Academy; Quaker Valley; St. Joseph; West Allegheny	Monty Python's Spamalot; **Young Frankenstein**; The Wiz; Pirates of Penzance; Shrek the Musical; Catch Me If You Can
Best Direction	--- --- --- --- --- ---	--- --- --- --- --- ---	Central Catholic; **Hampton**; Pine-Richland; Pittsburgh Barack Obama Academy; Quaker Valley; St. Joseph	Monty Python's Spamalot; **Young Frankenstein**; Thoroughly Modern Millie; The Wiz; Pirates of Penzance; Shrek the Musical
Best Supporting Actor	Rush Hodgin; Noah Baynes Lheureau; Drew Praskovich; Julius Ralph; Quintin Reynolds; **Michael Zak**	Trevor Graydon III; Robert Martin; Willard Hewitt; The Wizard; Cain/Japheth; **Patsy**	Pine-Richland; Bishop Canevin; Pittsburgh CAPA; Penn Hills; CW North Catholic; **Central Catholic**	Thoroughly Modern Millie; The Drowsy Chaperone; Footloose; The Wiz; Children of Eden; **Monty Python's Spamalot**
Best Supporting Actress	Leah Prestogeorge; Amanda Rulis; Jillian Schmidt; Mara Singleton; Ashley Sitarik; **Brooke Taylor**	Johanna Barker; Inga; Muzzy van Hossmere; K.C. Downing; Addaperle; **Beggar Woman/Lucy Barker**	Woodland Hills; Hampton; Pine-Richland; Plum; Our Lady of the Sacred Heart; **Woodland Hills**	Sweeney Todd; Young Frankenstein; Thoroughly Modern Millie; My Favorite Year; The Wiz; **Sweeney Todd**
Best Actor	**Ryan Borgo**; Connor Cook; Tom Currey; Peter Heres; Adam Rayan; Nathanial Yost	**Frank Abignale Jr.** Benjy Stone; Carl Hanratty; Pirate King; Tinman; King Arthur	**West Allegheny**; Plum; West Allegheny; Quaker Valley; Penn Hills; Central Catholic	**Catch Me If You Can**; My Favorite Year; Catch Me If You Can; Pirates of Penzance; The Wiz; Monty Python's Spamalot
Best Actress	Abby Dionise; Alexandra Illescas; Alexis Loiselle; Mallory Millberger; **Marnie Quick**; Savannah Wiggins	Miss Dorothy Brown; Rusty; Millie Dillmount; Princess Fiona; **Tinman**; Dorothy	Pine-Richland; Pittsburgh CAPA; Pine-Richland; St. Joseph; **Pittsburgh Barack Obama Academy**; Penn Hills	Thoroughly Modern Millie; Footloose; Thoroughly Modern Millie; Shrek the Musical; **The Wiz**; The Wiz
Best Musical; Budget Category I	--- --- ---	--- --- ---	**Pittsburgh Barack Obama**; Quaker Valley; St. Joseph	**The Wiz**; Pirates of Penzance; Shrek the Musical
Best Musical; Budget Category II	--- --- ---	--- --- ---	Bishop Canevin; Central Catholic; **Hampton**	The Drowsy Chaperone; Monty Python's Spamalot; **Young Frankenstein**
Best Musical; Budget Category III	--- --- ---	--- --- ---	Penn Hills; Pine-Richland; **West Allegheny**	The Wiz; Thoroughly Modern Millie; **Catch Me If You Can**

=== 2013 nominees and winners ===
Category	Nominee	Role	School	Musical
Best Scenic Design; Budget Category I	--- --- ---	--- --- ---	Pittsburgh Barack Obama; **Pittsburgh CAPA**; Quaker Valley	Once on This Island; **In the Heights**; Anything Goes
Best Scenic Design; Budget Category II	--- --- ---	--- --- ---	Bishop Canevin; Chartiers Valley; **West Mifflin**	In the Heights; 9 to 5; **Willy Wonka**
Best Scenic Design; Budget Category III	--- --- ---	--- --- ---	Baldwin; Plum; **Woodland Hills**	Hairspray; Seussical; **Young Frankenstein**
Best Costume Design; Budget Category I	--- --- ---	--- --- ---	Our Lady of the Sacred Heart; Pittsburgh CAPA; **St. Joseph**	Honk! In the Heights; **Seussical**
Best Costume Design; Budget Category II	--- --- ---	--- --- ---	Central Catholic; Hampton; **Keystone Oaks**	Curtains; Legally Blonde; **The Drowsy Chaperone**
Best Costume Design; Budget Category III	--- --- ---	--- --- ---	North Hills; **Plum**; Woodland Hills	The Pajama Game; **Seussical**; Young Frankenstein
Best Lighting Design; Budget Category I	--- --- ---	--- --- ---	Our Lady of the Sacred Heart; **Pittsburgh Barack Obama**; Pittsburgh CAPA	Honk! **Once on This Island**; In the Heights
Best Lighting Design; Budget Category II	--- --- ---	--- --- ---	Bishop Canevin; **Chartiers Valley**; Keystone Oaks	In the Heights; **9 to 5** The Drowsy Chaperone
Best Lighting Design; Budget Category III	--- --- ---	--- --- ---	Baldwin; Pine-Richland; **Woodland Hills**	Hairspray; Big; **Young Frankenstein**
Best All-Student Orchestra	--- --- --- --- --- ---	--- --- --- --- --- ---	North Hills; Pine-Richland; Pittsburgh Barack Obama; **Pittsburgh CAPA**; Plum; Shady Side Academy	The Pajama Game; Big; Once on This Island; **In the Heights**; Seussical; West Side Story
Best Choreography	--- --- --- --- --- ---	--- --- --- --- --- ---	Chartiers Valley; Keystone Oaks; **Penn Hills**; Pittsburgh Barack Obama; Pittsburgh CAPA; Quaker Valley	9 to 5 The Drowsy Chaperone; **All Shook Up**; Once on This Island; In the Heights; Anything Goes
Best Crew/ Technical Execution	--- --- --- --- --- ---	--- --- --- --- --- ---	Avonworth; Bishop Canevin; Chartiers Valley; Pittsburgh CAPA; Quaker Valley; **Woodland Hills**	Phantom of the Opera; In the Heights; 9 to 5 In the Heights; Anything Goes; **Young Frankenstein**
Best Ensemble	--- --- --- --- --- ---	--- --- --- --- --- ---	Baldwin; Chartiers Valley; Keystone Oaks; Pittsburgh Barack Obama; **Pittsburgh CAPA**; Plum	Hairspray; 9 to 5 The Drowsy Chaperone; Once on This Island; **In the Heights**; Seussical
Best Direction	--- --- --- --- --- ---	--- --- --- --- --- ---	Avonworth; Central Catholic; Chartiers Valley; Keystone Oaks; **Pittsburgh CAPA**; Quaker Valley	Phantom of the Opera; Curtains; 9 to 5 The Drowsy Chaperone; **In the Heights**; Anything Goes
Best Supporting Actor	Greg Arcuri; Benjamin Blinn; Lucas Grasha; Peter Heres; **Justin McCord**; Brandon Pent	Edna Turnblad; Dennis; Adolpho; Lord Evelyn Oakleugh; **Igor**; Graffiti Pete	Baldwin; Penn Hills; Keystone Oaks; Quaker Valley; **Woodland Hills**; Pittsburgh CAPA	Hairspray; All Shook Up; The Drowsy Chaperone; Anything Goes; **Young Frankenstein**; In the Heights
Best Supporting Actress	Heather Catley; Marika Countouris; Katie Manuel; **Michala Williams**; Jennifer Yeager; Molly Young	Sylvia; Elizabeth Benning; Erma; **Abuela Claudia**; Paulette; The Drowsy Chaperone	Penn Hills; Woodland Hills; Quaker Valley; **Pittsburgh CAPA**; Hampton; Keystone Oaks	All Shook Up; Young Frankenstein; Anything Goes; **In the Heights**; Legally Blonde; The Drowsy Chaperone
Best Actor	Austin Adomitis; Ryan Borgo; Connor Cook; Nathan Pool; **Angelo Ragghianti**; Michael Zak	Lt. Frank Cioffi; Freddy; Horton; Phantom; **Usnavi**; Aaron Fox	Central Catholic; West Allegheny; Plum; Avonworth; **Pittsburgh CAPA**; Central Catholic	Curtains; Dirty Rotten Scoundrels; Seussical; Phantom of the Opera; **In the Heights**; Curtains
Best Actress	Emma Baker; Maggie Brooks; **Rachael Houser**; Cassie Lombardo; Maddie Kocur; Katherine Rogers	Christine Daae; Tracy Turnblad; **Reno Sweeney**; Elle Woods; Annie; Natalie/Ed	Avonworth; Baldwin; **Quaker Valley**; Hampton; Riverview; Penn Hills	Phantom of the Opera; Hairspray; **Anything Goes**; Legally Blonde; Annie; All Shook Up
Best Musical; Budget Category I	--- --- ---	--- --- ---	Pittsburgh Barack Obama; **Pittsburgh CAPA**; Quaker Valley	Once on This Island; **In the Heights**; Anything Goes
Best Musical; Budget Category II	--- --- ---	--- --- ---	**Avonworth**; Chartiers Valley; Keystone Oaks	**Phantom of the Opera**; 9 to 5 The Drowsy Chaperone
Best Musical; Budget Category III	--- --- ---	--- --- ---	**Baldwin**; Plum; Woodland Hills	**Hairspray**; Seussical; Young Frankenstein

=== 2012 nominees and winners ===
Category	Nominee	Role	School	Musical
Best Scenic Design; Budget Category I	--- --- ---	--- --- ---	Our Lady of the Sacred Heart; Pittsburgh Perry; **Quaker Valley**	How to Succeed... Little Shop of Horrors; **Guys & Dolls**
Best Scenic Design; Budget Category II	--- --- ---	--- --- ---	Avonworth; Bishop Canevin; **Hampton**	Sweeney Todd; Bye Bye Birdie; **Damn Yankees**
Best Scenic Design; Budget Category III	--- --- ---	--- --- ---	Baldwin; North Hills; **Woodland Hills**	Curtains; My Fair Lady; **Curtains**
Best Costume Design; Budget Category I	--- --- ---	--- --- ---	Our Lady of the Sacred Heart; Quaker Valley; **St. Joseph**	How to Succeed... Guys & Dolls; **Once Upon a Mattress**
Best Costume Design; Budget Category II	--- --- ---	--- --- ---	Avonworth; Bishop Canevin; **Hampton**	Sweeney Todd; Bye Bye Birdie; **Damn Yankees**
Best Costume Design; Budget Category III	--- --- ---	--- --- ---	North Hills; **Winchester Thurston**; Woodland Hills	My Fair Lady; **Avenue Q** Curtains
Best Lighting Design; Budget Category I	--- --- ---	--- --- ---	North Catholic; Our Lady of the Sacred Heart; **Quaker Valley**	Little Shop of Horrors; How to Succeed... **Guys & Dolls**
Best Lighting Design; Budget Category II	--- --- ---	--- --- ---	**Avonworth**; Hampton; McKeesport	**Sweeney Todd**; Damn Yankees; Beauty and the Beast
Best Lighting Design; Budget Category III	--- --- ---	--- --- ---	Baldwin; North Hills; **Woodland Hills**	Curtains; My Fair Lady; **Curtains**
Best All-Student Orchestra	--- --- --- --- --- ---	--- --- --- --- --- ---	Hampton; **Moon**; North Hills; Pittsburgh Brashear; Pittsburgh CAPA; Pittsburgh Allderdice	Damn Yankees; **Guys & Dolls**; My Fair Lady; Back to the '80s Oliver! 25th Annual Putnam County Spelling Bee
Best Choreography	--- --- --- --- --- ---	--- --- --- --- --- ---	Avonworth; Baldwin; Bishop Canevin; **Hampton**; Quaker Valley; Woodland Hills	Sweeney Todd; Curtains; Bye Bye Birdie; **Damn Yankees**; Guys & Dolls; Curtains
Best Crew/ Technical Execution	--- --- --- --- --- ---	--- --- --- --- --- ---	Avonworth; Baldwin; North Hills; Penn Hills; Pittsburgh CAPA; **Woodland Hills**	Sweeney Todd; Curtains; My Fair Lady; Beauty and the Beast; Oliver! **Curtains**
Best Ensemble	--- --- --- --- --- ---	--- --- --- --- --- ---	Avonworth; Baldwin; Central Catholic; **Hampton**; Pittsburgh Perry; Quaker Valley	Sweeney Todd; Curtains; Bye Bye Birdie; **Damn Yankees**; Little Shop of Horrors; Guys & Dolls
Best Direction	--- --- --- --- --- ---	--- --- --- --- --- ---	**Avonworth**; Bishop Canevin; Pine-Richland; Quaker Valley; Winchester Thurston; Woodland Hills	**Sweeney Todd**; Bye Bye Birdie; The Wedding Singer; Guys & Dolls; Avenue Q Curtains
Best Supporting Actor	Jonathan Andrew; Zach Houston; Adam Johnson; Fletcher Jones; Vinnie Smith; **Ben Torisky**	Oscar; Nicely Nicely; Harry McAffee; Willard; Bud Frump; **Nathan Detroit**	Plum; Moon; Central Catholic; Pittsburgh Barack Obama; Our Lady of the Sacred Heart; **Quaker Valley**	Sweet Charity; Guys & Dolls; Bye Bye Birdie; Footloose; How to Succeed... **Guys & Dolls**
Best Supporting Actress	**Emma Baker**; Maggie Brooks; Elena Falgione; Adrianne Knapp; Katelyn Maurer; Jennifer Yeager	**Beggar Woman**; Carmen Bernstein; Lucy; Smitty; Mae Peterson; Gloria	**Avonworth**; Baldwin; Winchester Thurston; Our Lady of the Sacred Heart; Bishop Canevin; Hampton	**Sweeney Todd**; Curtains; Avenue Q How to Succeed... Bye Bye Birdie; Damn Yankees
Best Actor	Connor Doran; Jonathan Hewitt; Tal Kroser; Zander Lyons; Michael O'Brien; **Nathan Pool**	Lt. Frank Cioffi; Applegate; Fagin; J. Pierpont Finch; Henry Higgins; **Sweeney Todd**	Baldwin; Hampton; Pittsburgh CAPA; Our Lady of the Sacred Heart; North Hills; **Avonworth**	Curtains; Damn Yankees; Oliver! How to Succeed... My Fair Lady; **Sweeney Todd**
Best Actress	Nia D'Emilio; Abby Dionise; Stephanie Higgins; Rachael Houser; Katie Rogers; **Brooke Tate**	Kate Monster; Julia; Eliza; Sarah; Belle; **Mrs. Lovett**	Winchester Thurston; Pine-Richland; North Hills; Quaker Valley; Penn Hills; **Avonworth**	Avenue Q The Wedding Singer; My Fair Lady; Guys & Dolls; Beauty and the Beast; **Sweeney Todd**
Best Musical; Budget Category I	--- --- ---	--- --- ---	Our Lady of the Sacred Heart; Pittsburgh Barack Obama; **Quaker Valley**	How to Succeed... Footloose; **Guys & Dolls**
Best Musical; Budget Category II	--- --- ---	--- --- ---	**Avonworth**; Bishop Canevin; Hampton	**Sweeney Todd**; Bye Bye Birdie; Damn Yankees
Best Musical; Budget Category III	--- --- ---	--- --- ---	**Baldwin**; North Hills; Woodland Hills	**Curtains**; My Fair Lady; Curtains

=== 2011 nominees and winners ===
Category	Nominee	Role	School	Musical
Best Scenic Design; Budget Category I	--- --- ---	--- --- ---	Northgate; **Our Lady of the Sacred Heart**; Pittsburgh Schenley	All Shook Up; **Little Shop of Horrors**; Seussical
Best Scenic Design; Budget Category II	--- --- ---	--- --- ---	Bishop Canevin; **Chartiers Valley**; McKeesport	Annie Get Your Gun; **Footloose**; Pippin
Best Scenic Design; Budget Category III	--- --- ---	--- --- ---	North Hills; Pine-Richland; **Woodland Hills**	No, No, Nanette; Les Miserables; **Phantom of the Opera**
Best Costume Design; Budget Category I	--- --- ---	--- --- ---	Our Lady of the Sacred Heart; Pittsburgh Schenley; **St. Joseph**	Little Shop of Horrors; Seussical; **Beauty and the Beast**
Best Costume Design; Budget Category II	--- --- ---	--- --- ---	Bishop Canevin; **Central Catholic**; McKeesport	Annie Get Your Gun; **Fiddler on the Roof**; Pippin
Best Costume Design; Budget Category III	--- --- ---	--- --- ---	Pine-Richland; Riverview; **Woodland Hills**	Les Miserables; Beauty and the Beast; **Phantom of the Opera**
Best Lighting Design; Budget Category I	--- --- ---	--- --- ---	Pittsburgh CAPA; **Our Lady of the Sacred Heart**; Pittsburgh Schenley	Sweet Charity; **Little Shop of Horrors**; Seussical
Best Lighting Design; Budget Category II	--- --- ---	--- --- ---	Avonworth; Central Catholic; **Chartiers Valley**	Oklahoma! Fiddler on the Roof; **Footloose**
Best Lighting Design; Budget Category III	--- --- ---	--- --- ---	Baldwin; Pine-Richland; **Woodland Hills**	Children of Eden; Les Miserables; **Phantom of the Opera**
Best All-Student Orchestra	--- --- --- --- --- ---	--- --- --- --- --- ---	Pittsburgh Allderdice; Pittsburgh CAPA; Plum; North Hills; **Pine-Richland**; West Mifflin	Urinetown; Sweet Charity; Footloose; No, No, Nanette; **Les Misérables**; Seussical
Best Choreography	--- --- --- --- --- ---	--- --- --- --- --- ---	Central Catholic; Hampton; **North Hills**; Riverview; Pittsburgh Schenley; Woodland Hills	Fiddler on the Roof; West Side Story; **No, No, Nanette**; Beauty and the Beast; Seussical; Phantom of the Opera
Best Crew/ Technical Execution	--- --- --- --- --- ---	--- --- --- --- --- ---	Avonworth; Bishop Canevin; North Hills; Pine-Richland; West Mifflin; **Woodland Hills**	Oklahoma! Annie Get Your Gun; No, No, Nanette; Les Miserables; Seussical; **Phantom of the Opera**
Best Ensemble	--- --- --- --- --- ---	--- --- --- --- --- ---	Hampton; **North Hills**; Pine-Richland; Riverview; Pittsburgh Schenley; Woodland Hills	West Side Story; **No, No, Nanette**; Les Miserables; Beauty and the Beast; Seussical; Phantom of the Opera
Best Direction	--- --- --- --- --- ---	--- --- --- --- --- ---	Hampton; North Hills; Our Lady of the Sacred Heart; Pine-Richland; Pittsburgh Schenley; **Woodland Hills**	West Side Story; No, No, Nanette; Little Shop of Horrors; Les Miserables; Seussical; **Phantom of the Opera**
Best Supporting Actor	**Matt Augustyniak**; Ethan Butler; Jake Chavara; Peter Sorek; Mike Trimm; Harrison Wayne	**Billy Early**; Oscar; Thenardier; Raoul; Bernardo; Willard Hewitt	**North Hills**; Pittsburgh CAPA; Pine-Richland; Woodland Hills; Hampton; Chartiers Valley	**No, No, Nanette**; Sweet Charity; Les Miserables; Phantom of the Opera; West Side Story; Footloose
Best Supporting Actress	Mary Caparosa; Nina Danchenko; **Stephanie Higgins**; Rehima Jordan; Jennifer Rausch; Keyanna Taylor-Thomas	Carlotta; Mayzie; **Lucille Early**; Helene; Mme. Thenardier; Mayzie	Woodland Hills; West Mifflin; **North Hills**; Pittsburgh CAPA; Pine-Richland; Pittsburgh Schenley	Phantom of the Opera; Seussical; **No, No, Nanette**; Sweet Charity; Les Miserables; Seussical
Best Actor	Jonathan Andrew; Patrick Bovo; **Luke Halferty**; Zander Lyons; Connor McRory; Eric Sciulli	Ren; Finch; **Tevye**; Seymour; Ren; Phantom	Plum; Penn Hills; **Central Catholic**; Our Lady of the Sacred Heart; Chartiers Valley; Woodland Hills	Footloose; How To Succeed in Business Without Really Trying; **Fiddler on the Roof**; Little Shop of Horrors; Footloose; Phantom of the Opera
Best Actress	Maggie Brooks; Marika Countouris; Megan Hawbaker; **Kirsten Hoover**; Adrianne Knapp; Cassie Lombardo	Mama Noah; Christine; Eponine; **Nannette**; Audrey; Maria	Baldwin; Woodland Hills; Pine-Richland; **North Hills**; Our Lady of the Sacred Heart; Hampton	Children of Eden; Phantom of the Opera; Les Miserables; **No, No, Nanette**; Little Shop of Horrors; West Side Story
Best Musical; Budget Category I	--- --- ---	--- --- ---	Our Lady of the Sacred Heart; **Pittsburgh Schenley**; St. Joseph	Little Shop of Horrors; **Seussical**; Beauty and the Beast
Best Musical; Budget Category II	--- --- ---	--- --- ---	Bishop Canevin; Central Catholic; **Hampton**	Annie Get Your Gun; Fiddler on the Roof; **West Side Story**
Best Musical; Budget Category III	--- --- ---	--- --- ---	North Hills; Pine-Richland; **Woodland Hills**	No, No, Nanette; Les Miserables; **Phantom of the Opera**

=== 2010 nominees and winners ===
Category	Nominee	Role	School	Musical
Best Scenic Design	--- --- --- --- --- ---	--- --- --- --- --- ---	**Baldwin-Whitehall**; Chartiers Valley; North Hills; Pine-Richland; Pittsburgh Schenley; Woodland Hills	**Cats**; Seussical; Beauty and the Beast; Children of Eden; You're A Good Man, Charlie Brown; Annie
Best Costume Design	--- --- --- --- --- ---	--- --- --- --- --- ---	Central Catholic; McKeesport; Our Lady of the Sacred Heart; Penn Hills; **Pine-Richland**; Pittsburgh Schenley	The Wiz; The Wizard of Oz; Once On This Island; Thoroughly Modern Millie; **Children of Eden**; You're A Good Man, Charlie Brown
Best Lighting Design	--- --- --- --- --- ---	--- --- --- --- --- ---	Baldwin-Whitehall; Central Catholic; Our Lady of the Sacred Heart; **Pine-Richland**; Pittsburgh Schenley; Woodland Hills	Cats; The Wiz; Once On This Island; **Children of Eden**; You're A Good Man, Charlie Brown; Annie
Best All-Student Orchestra	--- --- --- --- --- ---	--- --- --- --- --- ---	Baldwin-Whitehall; Pine-Richland; Pittsburgh CAPA; Pittsburgh Schenley; **Plum**; West Mifflin	Cats; Children of Eden; Blood Brothers; You're A Good Man, Charlie Brown; **Anything Goes**; Annie
Best Choreography	--- --- --- --- --- ---	--- --- --- --- --- ---	Baldwin-Whitehall; Our Lady of the Sacred Heart; Penn Hills; Pine-Richland; **Pittsburgh Schenley**; Riverview	Cats; Once On This Island; Thoroughly Modern Millie; Children of Eden; **You're A Good Man, Charlie Brown**; Bye Bye Birdie
Best Crew/ Technical Execution	--- --- --- --- --- ---	--- --- --- --- --- ---	Baldwin-Whitehall; Hampton; North Hills; Pine-Richland; Pittsburgh Schenley; **Woodland Hills**	Cats; Guys and Dolls; Beauty and the Beast; Children of Eden; You're A Good Man, Charlie Brown; **Annie**
Best Ensemble	--- --- --- --- --- ---	--- --- --- --- --- ---	Baldwin-Whitehall; Central Catholic; Our Lady of the Sacred Heart; Pine-Richland; **Pittsburgh Schenley**; Riverview	Cats; The Wiz; Once On This Island; Children of Eden; **You're A Good Man, Charlie Brown**; Bye Bye Birdie
Best Direction	--- --- --- --- --- ---	--- --- --- --- --- ---	Baldwin-Whitehall; North Catholic; Our Lady of the Sacred Heart; **Pine-Richland**; Pittsburgh Schenley; Woodland Hills	Cats; Lucky Stiff; Once On This Island; **Children of Eden**; You're A Good Man, Charlie Brown; Annie
Best Supporting Actor	Jonathan Andrew; Connor Doran; P.J. McMahon; Michael O'Brien; Mike Trimm; **Spencer Whale**	Moonface; Skimbleshanks; Cain; Cogsworth; Nathan Detroit; **Lumiere**	Plum; Balwin-Whitehall; Pine-Richland; North Hills; Hampton; **North Hills**	Anything Goes; Cats; Children of Eden; Beauty and the Beast; Guys and Dolls; **Beauty and the Beast**
Best Supporting Actress	Katie Colosimo; **Maddie Georgi**; Courtney Handlovich; Jaslyn Hodge; Shayla Mitrick; Chelsea Stewart	Yonah; **Miss Adelaide**; Jellylorum; Sally; Rita LaPorta; Agnes Gooch	Pine-Richland; **Hampton**; Baldwin-Whitehall; Pittsburgh Schenley; North Catholic; Avonworth	Children of Eden; **Guys and Dolls**; Cats; You're A Good Man, Charlie Brown; Lucky Stiff; Mame
Best Actor	Patrick Bovo; Jeff Burgess; Johnny Falconi; **Alex Field**; Connor McRory; Donovan Smith	Jimmy Smith; Father; Cat In The Hat; **Tin Man**; Cat In The Hat; Oliver Warbucks	Penn Hills; Pine-Richland; Quaker Valley; **Central Catholic**; Chartiers Valley; Woodland Hills	Thoroughly Modern Millie; Children of Eden; Seussical; **The Wiz**; Seussical; Annie
Best Actress	Jamie Bruno; Kirsten Hoover; Carly Otte; Raychel Shipley; Kyleigh Taylor; **Andrea Weinzierl**	Gertrude; Belle; Millie Dillmount; Eve; Ti Moune; **Mame**	Chartiers Valley; North Hills; Penn Hills; Pine-Richland; Our Lady of the Sacred Heart; **Avonworth**	Seussical; Beauty and the Beast; Thoroughly Modern Millie; Children of Eden; Once On This Island; **Mame**
Best Musical; Budget Category I	--- --- ---	--- --- ---	Our Lady of the Sacred Heart; Pittsburgh CAPA; **Pittsburgh Schenley**	Once On This Island; Blood Brothers; **You're A Good Man, Charlie Brown**
Best Musical; Budget Category II	--- --- ---	--- --- ---	**Central Catholic**; Chartiers Valley; Riverview	**The Wiz**; Seussical; Bye Bye Birdie
Best Musical; Budget Category III	--- --- ---	--- --- ---	Baldwin-Whitehall; Penn Hills; **Pine-Richland**	Cats; Thoroughly Modern Millie; **Children of Eden**

=== 2009 nominees and winners ===
Category	Nominee	Role	School	Musical
Best Scenic Design	--- --- --- --- --- ---	--- --- --- --- --- ---	Baldwin-Whitehall; Chartiers Valley; Hampton; McKeesport; West Mifflin; **Woodland Hills**	The Wizard of Oz; The Wedding Singer; Anything Goes; Once Upon A Mattress; Oklahoma! **The Wizard of Oz**
Best Costume Design	--- --- --- --- --- ---	--- --- --- --- --- ---	Bishop Canevin; Keystone Oaks; North Hills; **Pittsburgh CAPA**; Winchester Thurston; Woodland Hills	Anything Goes; Barnum; Oliver! **Anna Karenina**; The King and I The Wizard of Oz
Best Lighting Design	--- --- --- --- --- ---	--- --- --- --- --- ---	Avonworth; Baldwin-Whitehall; Bishop Canevin; Our Lady of the Sacred Heart; Riverview; **Woodland Hills**	Into the Woods; The Wizard of Oz; Anything Goes; Hello, Dolly! Jesus Christ, Superstar; **The Wizard of Oz**
Best All-Student Orchestra	--- --- --- --- --- ---	--- --- --- --- --- ---	North Hills; Pine-Richland; Pittsburgh CAPA; **Pittsburgh Schenley**; Plum; West Mifflin	Oliver! Carousel; Anna Karenina; **Return to the Forbidden Planet**; 42nd Street; Oklahoma!
Best Choreography	--- --- --- --- --- ---	--- --- --- --- --- ---	Baldwin-Whitehall; Chartiers Valley; North Hills; **Pine-Richland**; Pittsburgh Schenley; Woodland Hills	The Wizard of Oz; The Wedding Singer; Oliver! **Carousel**; Return to the Forbidden Planet; The Wizard of Oz
Best Crew/ Technical Execution	--- --- --- --- --- ---	--- --- --- --- --- ---	Baldwin-Whitehall; Chartiers Valley; North Hills; Penn Hills; West Mifflin; **Woodland Hills**	The Wizard of Oz; The Wedding Singer; Oliver! Oklahoma! Oklahoma! **The Wizard of Oz**
Best Ensemble	--- --- --- --- --- ---	--- --- --- --- --- ---	Baldwin-Whitehall; North Hills; Pine-Richland; Pittsburgh CAPA; **Pittsburgh Schenley**; Woodland Hills	The Wizard of Oz; Oliver! Carousel; Anna Karenina; **Return to the Forbidden Planet**; The Wizard of Oz
Best Direction	--- --- --- --- --- ---	--- --- --- --- --- ---	Baldwin-Whitehall; North Hills; Our Lady of the Sacred Heart; Pittsburgh CAPA; Pittsburgh Schenley; **Woodland Hills**	The Wizard of Oz; Oliver! Hello, Dolly! Anna Karenina; Return to the Forbidden Planet; **The Wizard of Oz**
Best Supporting Actor	Luke Halferty; **Teddy McKenna**; Connor McRory; Nick Ruffing; Francesco Salpietro; Justin Spittel	General; **Constantine**; George; Ali Hakim; Enoch Snow; Cogsworth	Central Catholic; **Pittsburgh CAPA**; Chartiers Valley; West Mifflin; Pine-Richland; Pittsburgh Allderdice	Kiss Me, Kate; **Anna Karenina**; The Wedding Singer; Oklahoma! Carousel; Beauty and the Beast
Best Supporting Actress	Loni Ben-Zvi; **Arielle Katcher**; Christine Lamendola; Rachel Miller; Marie Popovich; Chelsea Stewart	Ariel; **Carrie**; Cousin Nettie; Holly; Wicked Witch; Cinderella	Pittsburgh Schenley; **Pine-Richland**; Pine-Richland; Chartiers Valley; Baldwin-Whitehall; Avonworth	Return to the Forbidden Planet; **Carousel**; Carousel; The Wedding Singer; The Wizard of Oz; Into the Woods
Best Actor	Troy Beaudry; Timothy DeVita; Michael Ellwood; **Kian McCollum**; Bobby Podolinski; Shawn Russman	Fagin; Tin Man; Cookie; **Robbie Hart**; Father; Scarecrow	North Hills; Woodland Hills; Pittsburgh Schenley; **Chartiers Valley**; Vincentian; Baldwin-Whitehall	Oliver! The Wizard of Oz; Return to the Forbidden Planet; **The Wedding Singer**; Children of Eden; The Wizard of Oz
Best Actress	**Elizabeth Bailey**; Kirsten Hoover; Teressa LaGamba; Caitlin O'Connor; Andrea Weinzierl; Erin Zarisnak	**Anna Karenina**; Nancy; Miranda; Dolly Levi; Witch; Dorothy	**Pittsburgh CAPA**; North Hills; Pittsburgh Schenley; Our Lady of the Sacred Heart; Avonworth; Baldwin-Whitehall	**Anna Karenina**; Oliver! Return to the Forbidden Planet; Hello, Dolly! Into the Woods; The Wizard of Oz
Best Musical; Budget Category I	--- --- ---	--- --- ---	North Catholic; Pittsburgh CAPA; **Pittsburgh Schenley**	Anything Goes; Anna Karenina; **Return to the Forbidden Planet**
Best Musical; Budget Category II	--- --- ---	--- --- ---	Avonworth; **Chartiers Valley**; Our Lady of the Sacred Heart	Into the Woods; **The Wedding Singer**; Hello, Dolly!
Best Musical; Budget Category III	--- --- ---	--- --- ---	Baldwin-Whitehall; North Hills; **Woodland Hills**	The Wizard of Oz; Oliver! **The Wizard of Oz**

=== 2008 nominees and winners ===
Category	Nominee	Role	School	Musical
Best Scenic Design	--- --- --- --- --- ---	--- --- --- --- --- ---	Central Catholic; Hampton; North Catholic; Pine-Richland; St. Joseph; **Woodland Hills**	Beauty and the Beast; Into the Woods; Seussical; Seussical; Once on This Island; **Beauty and the Beast**
Best Costume Design	--- --- --- --- --- ---	--- --- --- --- --- ---	Central Catholic; Eden Christian Academy; North Catholic; Perry Traditional Academy; **Pine-Richland**; Woodland Hills	Beauty and the Beast; Narnia, the Musical; Seussical; Urinetown; **Seussical**; Beauty and the Beast
Best Lighting Design	--- --- --- --- --- ---	--- --- --- --- --- ---	Central Catholic; North Catholic; Pine-Richland; Quaker Valley; Riverview; **Woodland Hills**	Beauty and the Beast; Seussical; Seussical; Footloose; Aida; **Beauty and the Beast**
Best All-Student Orchestra	--- --- --- --- --- ---	--- --- --- --- --- ---	CAPA; Hampton; Pine-Richland; Plum; **Taylor Allderdice**; West Mifflin	Children of Eden; Into the Woods; Seussical; Singin' in the Rain; **Footloose**; The Wiz
Best Choreography	--- --- --- --- --- ---	--- --- --- --- --- ---	**Central Catholic**; North Catholic; North Hills; Pine-Richland; Plum; Woodland Hills	**Beauty and the Beast**; Seussical; Dames at Sea; Seussical; Singin' in the Rain; Beauty and the Beast
Best Crew/ Technical Execution	--- --- --- --- --- ---	--- --- --- --- --- ---	Baldwin-Whitehall; **Hampton**; Keystone Oaks; North Catholic; West Mifflin; Woodland Hills	Beauty and the Beast; **Into the Woods**; Brigadoon; Seussical; The Wiz; Beauty and the Beast
Best Ensemble	--- --- --- --- --- ---	--- --- --- --- --- ---	Central Catholic; North Hills; Our Lady of the Sacred Heart; **Pine-Richland**; Schenley; Woodland Hills	Beauty and the Beast; Dames at Sea; Joseph and the Amazing; Technicolor Dreamcoat; **Seussical**; All Shook Up; Beauty and the Beast
Best Direction	--- --- --- --- --- ---	--- --- --- --- --- ---	Central Catholic; Hampton; **North Catholic**; North Hills; Pine-Richland; Woodland Hills	Beauty and the Beast; Into the Woods; **Seussical**; Dames at Sea; Seussical; Beauty and the Beast
Best Supporting Actor	**Michael Campayno**; Alex Cosentino; Brad Pietryga; Nicholas Rushe; Ted Stevenson; Shaun Umpleby	**Gaston**; Mareb; Cosmo Brown; Lumiere; Lumiere; The Wiz	**Central Catholic**; Riverview; Plum; Woodland Hills; Central Catholic; West Mifflin	**Beauty and the Beast**; Aida; Singin' in the Rain; Beauty and the Beast; Beauty and the Beast; The Wiz
Best Supporting Actress	Hannah Belmonte; Katie Esswein; Maddie Georgi; Barbara Johnson; Arielle Katcher; **Teressa LaGamba**	Mrs. Potts; Joan; Little Red; Andrea; Mayzie; **Sylvia**	Woodland Hills; North Hills; Hampton; Winchester Thurston; Pine-Richland; **Schenley**	Beauty and the Beast; Dames at Sea; Into the Woods; Once on This Island; Seussical; **All Shook Up**
Best Actor	Jaron Frand; **Cody Hoellerman**; Jeff Markanich Kian McCollum; Bobby Neumeyer; Dylan Putas	Adam/Noah; **Cat in the Hat**; Joseph Chad; Beast; Cat in the Hat	CAPA; **Pine-Richland**; Our Lady of the Sacred Heart; Chartiers Valley; Central Catholic; Bishop Canevin	Children of Eden; **Seussical**; Joseph and the Amazing; Technicolor Dreamcoat; All Shook Up; Beauty and the Beast; Seussical
Best Actress	**Sarah Chybrzynski**; Lauren Gigliotti; Jane Jeffries; Sarah Jane Kirkland; Yin Yin Ou; Ally Scalo	**Belle**; Gertrude; Belle; Natalie; Ti Moune; Gertrude	**Woodland Hills**; Pine-Richland; Central Catholic; Schenley; Winchester Thurston; North Catholic	**Beauty and the Beast**; Seussical; Beauty and the Beast; All Shook Up; Once on This Island; Seussical
Best Musical; Budget Category I	--- --- ---	--- --- ---	CAPA; Perry Traditional Academy; **Schenley**	Children of Eden; Urinetown; **All Shook Up**
Best Musical; Budget Category II	--- --- ---	--- --- ---	**Central Catholic**; Hampton; North Catholic	**Beauty and the Beast**; Into the Woods; Seussical
Best Musical; Budget Category III	--- --- ---	--- --- ---	North Hills; **Pine-Richland**; Woodland Hills	Dames at Sea; **Seussical**; Beauty and the Beast

=== 2007 nominees and winners ===
The award winners from each category are bolded.

Category	Nominee	Role	School	Musical
Best Scenic Design	--- --- --- --- --- ---	--- --- --- --- --- ---	Baldwin; Chartiers Valley; **Pine-Richland**; Plum; South Park; Woodland Hills	Bye, Bye, Birdie; Sweet Charity; **Cats**; The Wizard of Oz; Jesus Christ Superstar; Les Misérables
Best Costume Design	--- --- --- --- --- ---	--- --- --- --- --- ---	North Catholic; **Pine-Richland**; Plum; Robinson Township; Christian; St. Joseph; Woodland Hills	Pippin; **Cats**; The Wizard of Oz; The Music Man A Year With Frog and Toad; Les Misérables
Best Lighting Design	--- --- --- --- --- ---	--- --- --- --- --- ---	Central Catholic; Chartiers Valley; North Allegheny; **Pine-Richland**; Plum; Woodland Hills	Grease; Sweet Charity; Oklahoma! **Cats**; The Wizard of Oz; Les Misérables
Best All-Student Orchestra	--- --- --- --- --- ---	--- --- --- --- --- ---	Allderdice; Baldwin; **North Allegheny**; Pine-Richland; Plum; Shaler	Bye, Bye, Birdie; Bye, Bye, Birdie; **Oklahoma!** Cats; The Wizard of Oz; Grease
Best Choreography	--- --- --- --- --- ---	--- --- --- --- --- ---	Bishop Canevin; **North Catholic**; North Hills; Plum; Vincentian Academy; Winchester Thurston	The Boyfriend; **Pippin**; Thoroughly Modern Millie; The Wizard of Oz; Guys & Dolls; Urinetown
Best Crew/ Technical Execution	--- --- --- --- --- ---	--- --- --- --- --- ---	North Hills; Our Lady of the Sacred Heart; **Pine-Richland**; Riverview; Serra Catholic; Woodland Hills	Thoroughly Modern Millie; Working **Cats**; The Wizard of Oz; The King and I Les Misérables
Best Ensemble	--- --- --- --- --- ---	--- --- --- --- --- ---	Chartiers Valley; McKeesport; North Catholic; Our Lady of the Sacred Heart; **Winchester Thurston**; Woodland Hills	Sweet Charity; Crazy for You; Pippin; Working **Urinetown**; Les Misérables
Best Direction	--- --- --- --- --- ---	--- --- --- --- --- ---	Chartiers Valley; North Catholic; North Hills; Plum; **Winchester Thurston**; Woodland Hills	Sweet Charity; Pippin; Thoroughly Modern Millie; The Wizard of Oz; **Urinetown**; Les Misérables
Best Supporting Actor	**Gerard Michael D'Emilio**; Phil Franks; Jeff Markovich Vincent Myers; Peter Randolph; Francesco Salpietro	**Officer Lockstock**; Moonface Martin; Tom Patrick Marius; King Charles; Munkustrap	**Winchester Thurston**; Keystone Oaks; Our Lady of the Sacred Heart; Woodland Hills; North Catholic; Pine-Richland	**Urinetown**; Anything Goes; Working Les Misérables; Pippin; Cats
Best Supporting Actress	Anne Arezina; Emily Bull Teressa Lagamba; Samanta Lerda; Jennifer Machen; **Natalie Schaefer**	Berthe; Maggie Darlene Love; Bombalurina; Little Sally; **Grizabella**	North Catholic; Our Lady of the Sacred Heart; Schenley; Pine-Richland; Winchester Thurston; **Pine-Richland**	Pippin; Working Leader of the Pack; Cats; Urinetown; **Cats**
Best Actor	Justin Fortunato; Kurt Giammatti; Tim Morgan; Connor Mrozowski; **Corey O'Connor**; Brad Pietryga	Albert Peterson; Fred Graham; Jesus; Bobby Strong; **Oscar**; Scarecrow	Baldwin; Hampton; South Park; Winchester Thurston; **Chartiers Valley**; Plum	Bye, Bye, Birdie; Kiss Me, Kate; Jesus Christ Superstar; Urinetown; **Sweet Charity**; The Wizard of Oz
Best Actress	Christina Bordini; Maggie Carr; **Nicole Dohoda**; Alix Keil; Sarah Jane Kirkland; Madison Micucci	Nickie; Lilli Vanessi; **Millie**; Charity; Ellie; Laurie	Chartiers Valley; Hampton; **North Hills**; Chartiers Valley; Schenley; North Allegheny	Sweet Charity; Kiss Me, Kate; **Thoroughly Modern Millie**; Sweet Charity; Leader of the Pack; Oklahoma!
Best Musical; Budget Category I	--- --- ---	--- --- ---	Deer Lakes; St. Joseph; **South Park**	42nd Street; A Year With Frog and Toad; **Jesus Christ Superstar**
Best Musical; Budget Category II	--- --- ---	--- --- ---	Chartiers Valley; Plum; **Winchester Thurston**	Sweet Charity; The Wizard of Oz; **Urinetown**
Best Musical; Budget Category III	--- --- ---	--- --- ---	North Hills; **Pine-Richland**; Woodland Hills	Thoroughly Modern Millie; **Cats**; Les Misérables

=== 2006 nominees and winners ===
The award winners from each category are bolded.

Category	Nominee	Role	School	Musical
Best Scenic Design	--- --- --- --- --- ---	--- --- --- --- --- ---	Baldwin; Hampton; McKeesport; **Pine-Richland**; Robinson Township Christian; Winchester Thurston	My One and Only; Oliver; Anything Goes; **Pirates of Penzance**; The Sound Of Music; Hot Mikado
Best Costume Design	--- --- --- --- --- ---	--- --- --- --- --- ---	North Catholic; Our Lady of the Sacred Heart; Perry Traditional; Pine-Richland; Schenley; **Winchester Thurston**	The Wiz; Seussical Beauty And The Beast; Pirates of Penzance; Joseph; **Hot Mikado**
Best Lighting Design	--- --- --- --- --- ---	--- --- --- --- --- ---	Chartiers Valley; North Allegheny; Pine-Richland; Serra Catholic; Winchester Thurston; **Woodland Hills**	Damn Yankees; Guys & Dolls; Pirates of Penzance; Children of Eden; Hot Mikado; **Pippin**
Best All-Student Orchestra	--- --- --- --- --- ---	--- --- --- --- --- ---	Hampton; North Allegheny; Perry; **Pine-Richland**; Plum; Schenley	Oliver; Guys & Dolls; Beauty and the Beast; Pirates of Penzance; Hello Dolly; Joseph
Best Choreography	--- --- --- --- --- ---	--- --- --- --- --- ---	McKeesport; North Allegheny; North Catholic; **Schenley**; Winchester Thurston; Woodland Hills	Anything Goes; Guys and Dolls; The Wiz; **Joseph**; Hot Mikado; Pippin
Best Crew/ Technical Execution	--- --- --- --- --- ---	--- --- --- --- --- ---	Hampton; McKeesport; North Catholic; Perry; Pine-Richland; **South Park**	Oliver; Anything Goes The Wiz; Beauty and the Beast; Pirates of Penzance; **Pippin**
Best Ensemble	--- --- --- --- --- ---	--- --- --- --- --- ---	**North Allegheny**; North Catholic; Our Lady of the Sacred Heart; Pine-Richland; Schenley; Winchester Thurston	**Guys & Dolls**; The Wiz; Seussical Piratez of Penzance; Joseph; Hot Mikado
Best Direction	--- --- --- --- --- ---	--- --- --- --- --- ---	North Catholic; Our Lady of the Sacred Heart; Pine-Richland; Riverview; Schenley; **Winchester Thurston**	The Wiz; Seussical Pirates of Penzance; The King and I Joseph; **Hot Mikado**
Best Supporting Actor	Aaron Bova; Michael D'Emilio; Brad Glasser; **Jeff Hahn**; Peter Randolph; Mike Washabaugh	Moonface Martin; Mikado; Charlemagne; **Nicely Nicely Johnson**; The Wiz; Cogsworth	McKeesport; Winchester Thurston; Woodland Hills; **North Allegheny**; North Catholic; Perry	Anything Goes; Hot Mikado; Pippin; **Guys & Dolls**; The Wiz; Beauty and the Beast
Best Supporting Actress	**Christina Bordini**; Ellen Caparosa; Phallon DePante; Sarah Jane Kirkland; Jennifer Machen; Sarah Wahl	**Meg**; Catherine; Katisha; Narrator; Pitti-Sing; Lina LeMont	**Chartiers Valley**; Woodland Hills; Winchester Thurston; Schenley; Winchester Thurston; Keystone Oaks	**Damn Yankees**; Pippin; Hot Mikado; Joseph; Hot Mikado; Singin' In The Rain
Best Actor	Christopher Devita; Zachary Drylie; Justin Fortunato; **Billy Hepfinger**; Noah Levin; Nathan Sudie	KoKo; The King; Billy Buck Chandler; **Sky Masterson**; Nanki-Poo; Father	Winchester Thurston; Riverview; Baldwin; **North Allegheny**; Winchester Thurston; Serra Catholic	Hot Mikado; The King and I My One and Only; **Guys & Dolls**; Hot Mikado; Children of Eden
Best Actress	Nicole Dohoda; Alexandra Jahn; Alix Keil; Mary Lamb; Lindsay Machen; **Mallory Praskovich**	Ruth; Miss Adelaide; Lola; Dorothy; Yum-Yum; **Gertrude**	North Hills; Penn Hills; Chartiers Valley; North Catholic; Winchester Thurston; **Our Lady of the** **Sacred Heart**	Wonderful Town; Guys & Dolls; Damn Yankees; The Wiz; Hot Mikado; **Seussical**
Best Musical; Budget Category I	--- --- ---	--- --- ---	Our Lady of the Sacred Heart; Robinson Township Christian; **Winchester Thurston**	Seussical The Sound Of Music; **Hot Mikado**
Best Musical; Budget Category II	--- --- ---	--- --- ---	Chartiers Valley; **North Catholic**; Schenley	Damn Yankees; **The Wiz**; Joseph
Best Musical; Budget Category III	--- --- ---	--- --- ---	Hampton; North Allegheny; **Pine-Richland**	Oliver; Guys & Dolls; **Pirates of Penzance**

=== 2005 nominees and winners ===
Category	Nominee	Role	School	Musical
Best Scenic Design; Budget Category I	--- --- ---	--- --- ---	Perry; **St .Joseph**; Winchester Thurston	Seussical; **Man of La Mancha**; Pippin
Best Scenic Design; Budget Category II	--- --- ---	--- --- ---	**Plum**; Quaker Valley; Riverview	**Annie**; Oklahoma; Oklahoma
Best Scenic Design; Budget Category III	--- --- ---	--- --- ---	Bishop Canevin; Pine-Richland; **Woodland Hills**	Once Upon A Mattress; Crazy for You; **Seussical**
Best Costume Design; Budget Category I	--- --- ---	--- --- ---	**Our Lady of the Sacred Heart**; St. Joseph; Winchester Thurston	**Bye Bye Birdie**; Man of La Mancha; Pippin
Best Costume Design; Budget Category II	--- --- ---	--- --- ---	Northgate; **Plum**; Riverview	Copacabana; **Annie**; Oklahoma
Best Costume Design; Budget Category III	--- --- ---	--- --- ---	**Chartiers Valley**; North Allegheny; Woodland Hills	**Beauty and the Beast**; Titanic; Seussical
Best Lighting Design; Budget Category I	--- --- ---	--- --- ---	Baldwin; **Perry**; Winchester Thurston	The Pajama Game; **Seussical**; Pippin
Best Lighting Design; Budget Category II	--- --- ---	--- --- ---	Plum; **Quaker Valley**; Riverview	Annie; **Oklahoma**; Oklahoma
Best Lighting Design; Budget Category III	--- --- ---	--- --- ---	Chartiers Valley; North Allegheny; **Woodland Hills**	Beauty and the Beast; Titanic; **Seussical**
Best All-Student Orchestra	--- --- --- --- ---	--- --- --- --- ---	Baldwin; **North Allegheny**; Plum; Taylor Allderdice; Winchester Thurston	The Pajama Game; **Titanic**; Annie; Seussical; Pippin
Best Choreography	--- --- --- --- ---	--- --- --- --- ---	Central Catholic; Chartiers Valley; Riverview; Schenley; **Winchester Thurston**	42nd Street; Beauty and the Beast; Oklahoma; Grease; **Pippin**
Best Crew/ Technical Execution	--- --- --- --- ---	--- --- --- --- ---	Perry; Plum; Quaker Valley; Winchester Thurston; **Woodland Hills**	Seussical; Annie; Oklahoma; Pippin; **Seussical**
Best Ensemble	--- --- --- --- ---	--- --- --- --- ---	Chartiers Valley; **North Allegheny**; Schenley; Winchester Thurston; Woodland Hills	Beauty and the Beast; **Titanic**; Grease; Pippin; Seussical
Best Direction	--- --- --- --- ---	--- --- --- --- ---	**Chartiers Valley**; North Allegheny; St. Joseph; Winchester Thurston; Quaker Valley	**Beauty and the Beast**; Titanic; Man of La Mancha; Pippin; Seussical
Best Supporting Actor	Ankit Dhir; Justin Fortunato; Sam Griffin; John Ladd; **Corey O'Connor**	J. Bruce Ismay; Vernon Hines; Ali Hakem; Minstrel; **Cogsworth**	North Allegheny; Baldwin; Riverview; Bishop Canevin; **Chartiers Valley**	Titanic; The Pajama Game; Oklahoma; Once Upon A Mattress; **Beauty and the Beast**
Best Supporting Actress	Jordan DeVaughn; Alex Knell; **Mallory Praskovich**; Pam Savitz; Ilana Toeplitz	Mayzie; Alice Beane; **Ursula**; JoJo; Berthe	Perry; North Allegheny; **Our Lady of Sacred Heart**; Taylor Allderdice; Winchester Thurston	Seussical; Titanic; **Bye Bye Birdie**; Seussical; Pippin
Best Actor	Dustin Giffin; Billy Hepfinger; **Ben Johnson**; Nathan Sudie; Tony Venni	The Beast; Thomas Andrews; **Pippin**; Fagin; Tony	Chartiers Valley; West Allegheny; **Winchester Thurston**; Serra Catholic; Penn Hills	Beauty and the Beast; Titanic; **Pippin**; Oliver; Copacabana
Best Actress	Heather Hamm; Kala Kelly; Jeanette Lundel; Leigh Michelow; **Amy Platt**	Lola; Gertrude; Peggy Sawyer; Gertrude; **Cat in the Hat**	Penn Hills; Perry; Central Catholic; Taylor Allderdice; **Woodland Hills**	Copacabana; Seussical; 42nd Street; Seussical; **Seussical**
Best Musical; Budget Category I	--- --- ---	--- --- ---	Our Lady of the Sacred Heart; Serra Catholic; **Winchester Thurston**	Bye Bye Birdie; Oliver; **Pippin**
Best Musical; Budget Category II	--- --- ---	--- --- ---	Quaker Valley; **Riverview**; Schenley	Oklahoma; **Oklahoma**; Grease
Best Musical; Budget Category III	--- --- ---	--- --- ---	**Chartiers Valley**; North Allegheny; Woodland Hills	**Beauty and the Beast**; Titanic; Seussical

=== 2004 nominees and winners ===
Category	Nominee	Role	School	Musical
Best Scenic Design; Budget Category I	--- --- ---	--- --- ---	Perry; Riverview; **Winchester Thurston**	Copacabana; Anything Goes; **Pirates of Penzance**
Best Scenic Design; Budget Category II	--- --- ---	--- --- ---	Bishop Canevin; **Elizabeth Forward**; Our Lady of the Sacred Heart	How To Succeed; **Oliver**; Once Upon A Mattress
Best Scenic Design; Budget Category III	--- --- ---	--- --- ---	Baldwin; **Pine-Richland**; Woodland Hills	Anything Goes; **Joseph**; Anything Goes
Best Costume Design; Budget Category I	--- --- ---	--- --- ---	Perry; St. Joseph; **Winchester Thurston**	Copacabana; Children Of Eden; **Pirates of Penzance**
Best Costume Design; Budget Category II	--- --- ---	--- --- ---	**Bishop Canevin**; Elizabeth Forward; Northgate	**How To Succeed**; Oliver; Lil Abner
Best Costume Design; Budget Category III	--- --- ---	--- --- ---	North Allegheny; **Pine-Richland**; Woodland Hills	The Music Man; **Joseph**; Anything Goes
Best Lighting Design; Budget Category I	--- --- ---	--- --- ---	Deer Lakes; Perry; **Winchester Thurston**	Joseph; Copacabana; **Pirates of Penzance**
Best Lighting Design; Budget Category II	--- --- ---	--- --- ---	Bishop Canevin; Schenley; **South Park**	How To Succeed; Smokey Joe's Cafe; **Into The Woods**
Best Lighting Design; Budget Category III	--- --- ---	--- --- ---	Baldwin; North Allegheny; **Pine-Richland**	Anything Goes; The Music Man; **Joseph**
Best All-Student Orchestra	--- --- --- --- ---	--- --- --- --- ---	Baldwin; Plum; **Pine-Richland**; Schenley; Taylor Allderdice	Anything Goes; Bye Bye Birdie; **Joseph**; Smokey Joe's Cafe; Once Upon A Mattress
Best Choreography	--- --- --- --- ---	--- --- --- --- ---	Baldwin; Pine-Richland; **Quaker Valley**; Schenley; Winchester Thurston	Anything Goes; Joseph; **Pirates of Penzance**; Smokey Joe's Cafe; Pirate Of Penzance
Best Crew/ Technical Execution	--- --- --- --- ---	--- --- --- --- ---	Baldwin; Chartiers Valley; **North Catholic**; Pine-Richland; Woodland Hills	Anything Goes; Pippin; **Footloose**; Joseph; Anything Goes
Best Ensemble	--- --- --- --- ---	--- --- --- --- ---	Baldwin; Central Catholic; Pine-Richland; Quaker Valley; **Schenley**	Anything Goes; Crazy For You; Joseph; Pirates of Penzance; **Smokey Joe's Cafe**
Best Direction	--- --- --- --- ---	--- --- --- --- ---	Baldwin; **Pine-Richland**; Quaker Valley; Schenley; Winchester Thurston	Anything Goes; **Joseph**; Pirates of Penzance; Smokey Joe's Cafe; Pirates of Penzance
Best Supporting Actor	**Justin Fortunato**; Mark Frechione; Phil Giammattei; John Ladd; Eric Ojerholm	**Moonface Martin**; Major General; Willard; Bud Frump; Marcellus	**Baldwin**; Winchester Thurston; North Catholic; Bishop Canevin; North Allegheny	**Anything Goes**; Pirates of Penzance; Footloose; How to Succeed... The Music Man
Best Supporting Actress	Molly Donovan; Jenny Fetchko; **Amy Platt**; Lara Miller; Mallory Mousseau	Portia; Bullfrog; **Erma**; Ruth; Mae Peterson	Brentwood; Vincentian; **Woodland Hills**; Winchester Thurston; Plum	Cinderella; Honk; **Anything Goes**; Pirates of Penzance; Bye Bye Birdie
Best Lead Actor	Jordan DeBona; Phil Duprey; Billy Hepfinger; Dan Joyner; **Ben Reed**	Leading Player; Pirate King; Harold Hill; Pirate King; **Joseph**	Chartiers Valley; Quaker Valley; North Allegheny; Winchester Thurston; **Pine-Richland**	Pippin; Pirates of Penzance; The Music Man; Pirates of Penzance; **Joseph**
Best Lead Actress	Tori Brady; **Dana Lundquist**; Katie Maloney; Caroline Nicolian; Karen Sealy	Rose Alverez; **Mabel**; Marian Paroo; Lola; Princess Winnifred	Plum; **Quaker Valley**; North Allegheny; Perry; Our Lady of the Sacred Heart	Bye Bye Birdie; **Pirates of Penzance**; The Music Man; Copacabana; Once Upon A Mattress
Best Musical; Budget Category I	--- --- ---	--- --- ---	North Catholic; Perry; **Winchester Thurston**	Footloose; Copacabana; **Pirates of Penzance**
Best Musical; Budget Category II	--- --- ---	--- --- ---	Bishop Canevin; **Schenley**; South Park	How to Succeed; **Smokey Joe's Cafe**; Into The Woods
Best Musical; Budget Category III	--- --- ---	--- --- ---	Baldwin; **Pine-Richland**; Quaker Valley	Anything Goes; **Joseph**; Pirates of Penzance

=== 2003 nominees and winners ===
Category	Nominee	Role	School	Musical
Best Scenic Design; Budget Category I	--- --- ---	--- --- ---	Deer Lakes; **Our Lady of the Sacred Heart**; Steel Valley	Oliver; **The Sound of Music**; Grease
Best Scenic Design; Budget Category II	--- --- ---	--- --- ---	**Bishop Canevin**; Chartiers Valley; Riverview	**Kiss Me Kate**; West Side Story; Guys & Dolls
Best Scenic Design; Budget Category III	--- --- ---	--- --- ---	Baldwin; Pine-Richland; **Woodland Hills**	West Side Story; Guys & Dolls; **Hello Dolly**
Best Costume Design; Budget Category I	--- --- ---	--- --- ---	**Northgate**; South Allegheny; Trinity Christian	**The Pajama Game**; Cinderella; Fiddler on the Roof
Best Costume Design; Budget Category II	--- --- ---	--- --- ---	Brentwood; **Riverview**; Seton-La Salle	Smile; **Guys & Dolls**; Damn Yankees
Best Costume Design; Budget Category III	--- --- ---	--- --- ---	Montour; North Allegheny; **Woodland Hills**	Joseph; Les Miserables; **Hello Dolly**
Best Lighting Design; Budget Category I	--- --- ---	--- --- ---	Deer Lakes; St. Joseph; **Winchester Thurston**	Oliver; Honk; **Joseph**
Best Lighting Design; Budget Category II	--- --- ---	--- --- ---	Bishop Canevin; Chartiers Valley; **Riverview**	Kiss Me Kate; West Side Story; **Guys & Dolls**
Best Lighting Design; Budget Category III	--- --- ---	--- --- ---	Baldwin; Pine-Richland; **Woodland Hills**	West Side Story; Guys & Dolls; **Hello Dolly**
Best All-Student Orchestra	--- --- --- --- ---	--- --- --- --- ---	Perry; Pine-Richland; **Schenley**; Springdale; Winchester Thurston	Once Upon A Mattress; Guys & Dolls; **Lucky In The Rain**; Godspell; Joseph
Best Choreography	--- --- --- --- ---	--- --- --- --- ---	Baldwin; Chartiers Valley; Riverview; Schenley; **Woodland Hills**	West Side Story; West Side Story; Guys & Dolls; Lucky In The Rain; **Hello Dolly**
Best Crew/ Technical Execution	--- --- --- --- ---	--- --- --- --- ---	**Baldwin**; Bishop Canevin; Pine-Richland; Seton-La Salle; Woodland Hills	**West Side Story**; Kiss Me, Kate; Guys & Dolls; Damn Yankees; Hello Dolly
Best Ensemble	--- --- --- --- ---	--- --- --- --- ---	Baldwin; **North Allegheny**; Riverview; Quaker Valley; Schenley	West Side Story; **Les Misérables**; Guys & Dolls; Smile; Lucky In The Rain
Best Direction	--- --- --- --- ---	--- --- --- --- ---	Baldwin; North Allegheny; Northgate; Riverview; **Woodland Hills**	West Side Story; Les Miserables; The Pajama Game; Guys & Dolls; **Hello Dolly**
Best Supporting Actor	Joe Balestrino; John Graham; Dan Joyner; **Christian Ortiz**; Ben Reed	Willard; Bernardo; Pharaoh; **Thenardier**; Benny Southstreet	Central Catholic; Baldwin; Winchester Thurston; **North Allegheny**; Pine-Richland	Footloose; West Side Story; Joseph; **Les Misérables**; Guys & Dolls
Best Supporting Actress	**Jaimie Finseth**; Kaleigh King; Emily McGill; Deana Muraco; Jenna Noel	**Gertrude Stine**; Eponine; Gladys; Anita; Fantine	**Schenley**; North Allegheny; Northgate; Baldwin; North Allegheny	**Lucky In The Rain**; Les Miserables; The Pajama Game; West Side Story; Les Miserables
Best Lead Actor	Trey Compton; Alex DiClaudio; Ryan Kofford; Ryan Ogrondy; **Quinn Shannon**	Javert; Sky Masterson; Harold Hill; Sid; **Fred/Petrucio**	North Allegheny; Riverview; Plum; McKeesport; **Bishop Canevin**	Les Miserables; Guys & Dolls; The Music Man; The Pajama Game; **Kiss Me, Kate**
Best Lead Actress	**Ashley Gaines**; Elise Hindmarsh; Carolina Nicolian; Krystal Prosky; Carrie Zosack	**Dolly**; Sarah Brown; Princess Winifred; Miss Adelaide; Babe	**Woodland Hills**; Riverview; Perry; Riverview; McKeesport	**Hello Dolly**; Guys & Dolls; Once Upon A Mistake; Guys & Dolls; The Pajama Game
Best Musical; Budget Category I	--- --- ---	--- --- ---	Northgate; Our Lady of the Sacred Heart; **Winchester Thurston**	The Pajama Game; The Sound of Music; **Joseph**
Best Musical; Budget Category II	--- --- ---	--- --- ---	Bishop Canevin; **Riverview**; Schenley	Kiss Me, Kate; **Guys & Dolls**; Lucky In The Rain
Best Musical; Budget Category III	--- --- ---	--- --- ---	Baldwin; North Allegheny; **Woodland Hills**	West Side Story; Les Miserables; **Hello Dolly**

=== 2002 nominees and winners ===
Category	Nominee	Role	School	Musical
Best Scenic Design; Budget Category I	--- --- ---	--- --- ---	**Deer Lakes**; Perry; Winchester Thurston	**Once Upon A Mattress**; The Bakers Wife; Hello Dolly
Best Scenic Design; Budget Category II	--- --- ---	--- --- ---	Canevin Catholic; **Schenley**; Seton-La Salle	My Favorite Year; **The Melody Lingers On**; Miss Liberty
Best Scenic Design; Budget Category III	--- --- ---	--- --- ---	Baldwin; **Pine-Richland**; Springdale	The Music Man; **Fiddler On The Roof**; Peter Pan
Best Costume Design; Budget Category I	--- --- ---	--- --- ---	Deer Lakes; Our Lady of the Sacred Heart; **Winchester Thurston**	Once Upon A Mattress; Godspell; **Hello Dolly**
Best Costume Design; Budget Category II	--- --- ---	--- --- ---	**Canevin Catholic**; Schenley; Steel Valley	**My Favorite Year**; The Melody Lingers On; Oliver
Best Costume Design; Budget Category III	--- --- ---	--- --- ---	Baldwin; Montour; **Pine-Richland**	The Music Man; The Will Rogers Follies; **Fiddler On The Roof**
Best Lighting Design; Budget Category I	--- --- ---	--- --- ---	CAPA; **Deer Lakes**; Winchester Thurston	Where Mystery Lies; **Once Upon A Mattress**; Hello Dolly
Best Lighting Design; Budget Category II	--- --- ---	--- --- ---	Canevin Catholic; Chartiers Valley; **Schenley**	My Favorite Year; Footloose; **The Melody Lingers On**
Best Lighting Design; Budget Category III	--- --- ---	--- --- ---	North Allegheny; **Pine-Richland**; Woodland Hills	How To Succeed... **Fiddler On The Roof**; Evita
Best All-Student Orchestra	--- --- --- --- ---	--- --- --- --- ---	North Catholic; Pine-Richland; Plum; **Schenley**; South Allegheny	Annie Get Your Gun; Fiddler On The Roof; Fiddler On The Roof; **The Melody Lingers On**; Footloose
Best Choreography	--- --- --- --- ---	--- --- --- --- ---	Baldwin; Chartiers Valley; North Allegheny; Pine-Richland; **Schenley**	The Music Man; Footloose; How To Succeed... Fiddler On The Roof; **The Melody Lingers On**
Best Crew/ Technical Execution	--- --- --- --- ---	--- --- --- --- ---	Baldwin; Canevin Catholic; Chartiers Valley; Pine-Richland; Springdale	The Music Man; My Favorite Year; **Footloose**; Fiddler On The Roof; Peter Pan
Best Vocal Ensemble	--- --- --- --- ---	--- --- --- --- ---	CAPA; Chartiers Valley; Deer Lakes; Our Lady of the Sacred Heart; **Schenley**	Where Mystery Lies; Footloose; Once Upon A Mattress; Godspell; **The Melody Lingers On**
Best Direction	--- --- --- --- ---	--- --- --- --- ---	Chartiers Valley; North Allegheny; Pine-Richland; **Schenley**; Winchester Thurston	Footloose; How To Succeed... Fiddler On The Roof; **The Melody Lingers On**; Hello Dolly
Best Supporting Actor	Jim DuBois; Howard Frankel; Matt Gromley; Mike Milburn; **Mike Wilson**	--- --- --- --- ---	Chartiers Valley; Woodland Hills; Schenley; Chartiers Valley; **Schenley**	Footloose; Evita; The Melody Lingers On; Footloose; **The Melody Lingers On**
Best Supporting Actress	Ashley Gaines; Elise Hindmarsh; Kaleigh King; **Angela Machi**; Katelyn Wood	--- --- --- --- ---	Woodland Hills; Riverview; North Allegheny; **Schenley**; Seton-La Salle	Evita; Joseph; How To Succeed... **The Melody Lingers On**; Miss Liberty
Best Lead Actor	Benjamin Bruni; **Trey Compton**; Bernard Eyth; Quinn Shannon; Benjamin Shaw	--- --- --- --- ---	St. Joseph; **North Allegheny**; CAPA; Canevin Catholic; CAPA	Godspell; **How To Succeed...** Where Mystery Lies; How To Succeed... Where Mystery Lies
Best Lead Actress	Annie Claffey; Kate Dorman; Caitlin Reilly; Kate Rogal; **Brittany Taylor**	--- --- --- --- ---	North Catholic; Perry; Seton-La Salle; Wichester Thurston; **Woodland Hills**	Annie Get Your Gun; The Baker's Wife; Miss Liberty; Hello Dolly; **Evita**
Best Musical; Budget Category I	--- --- ---	--- --- ---	CAPA; Deer Lakes; **Winchester Thurston**	Where Mystery Lies; Once Upon A Mattress; **Hello Dolly**
Best Musical; Budget Category II	--- --- ---	--- --- ---	Chartiers Valley; North Catholic; **Schenley**	Footloose; Annie Get Your Gun; **The Melody Lingers On**
Best Musical; Budget Category III	--- --- ---	--- --- ---	Baldwin; **North Allegheny**; Pine-Richland	The Music Man; **How To Succeed...** Fiddler on the Roof

=== 2001 nominees and winners ===
Category	Nominee	Role	School	Musical
Best Scenic Design; Budget Category I	--- --- ---	--- --- ---	**Perry**; South Allegheny; Winchester Thurston	**Into The Woods**; Bye Bye Birdie; Into The Woods
Best Scenic Design; Budget Category II	--- --- ---	--- --- ---	**Chartiers Valley**; North Catholic; Schenley	**The Wiz**; The Pajama Game; Once On This Island
Best Scenic Design; Budget Category III	--- --- ---	--- --- ---	Montour; Pine-Richland; **Woodland Hills**	Once On This Island; My One and Only; **On the 20th Century**
Best Costume Design; Budget Category I	--- --- ---	--- --- ---	**Perry**; St. Joseph; Thomas Jefferson	**Into The Woods**; The Music Man; The Wizard of Oz
Best Costume Design; Budget Category II	--- --- ---	--- --- ---	**Chartiers Valley**; Schenley; Seton-La Salle	**The Wiz**; Once On This Island; Oklahoma
Best Costume Design; Budget Category III	--- --- ---	--- --- ---	Montour; Pine-Richland; **Woodland Hills**	Once On This Island; My One and Only; **On the 20th Century**
Best Lighting Design; Budget Category I	--- --- ---	--- --- ---	**CAPA**; Our Lady of the Sacred Heart; Perry	**...Forum**; Anything Goes; Into The Woods
Best Lighting Design; Budget Category II	--- --- ---	--- --- ---	Canevin Catholic; **Chartiers Valley**; Schenley	Pippin; **The Wiz**; Once On This Island
Best Lighting Design; Budget Category III	--- --- ---	--- --- ---	Plum; **Springdale**; Woodland Hills	Annie Get Your Gun; **The Wizard of Oz**; On the 20th Century
Best All-Student Orchestra	--- --- --- --- ---	--- --- --- --- ---	CAPA; **North Catholic**; Perry; Pine-Richland; Serra Catholic	...Forum; **The Pajama Game**; Into The Woods; My One and Only; Joseph
Best Choreography	--- --- --- --- ---	--- --- --- --- ---	Baldwin; CAPA; Chartiers Valley; Our Lady of the Sacred Heart; **Schenley**	Crazy For You...Forum; The Wiz; Anything Goes; **Once On This Island**
Best Crew/ Technical Execution	--- --- --- --- ---	--- --- --- --- ---	McKeesport; North Allegheny; Our Lady of the Sacred Heart; Seton-La Salle; **Woodland Hills**	Oklahoma; Crazy For You; Anything Goes; Oklahoma; **On the 20th Century**
Best Vocal Ensemble	--- --- --- --- ---	--- --- --- --- ---	CAPA; North Allegheny; Our Lady of the Sacred Heart; **Schenley**; Steel Valley	...Forum; Crazy For You; Anything Goes; **Once On This Island**; How To Succeed...
Best Direction	--- --- --- --- ---	--- --- --- --- ---	CAPA; **Chartiers Valley**; North Allegheny; Pine-Richland; Schenley	...Forum; **The Wiz**; Crazy For You; My One and Only; Once On This Island
Best Supporting Actor	Eric Cheski; **Ryan Giovengo Boody**; Ben Reed; Cisco Rios; Derek Steele	--- --- --- --- ---	Chartiers Valley; **CAPA**; Pine-Richland; Woodland Hills; Schenley	The Wiz **...Forum**; My One and Only; On the 20th Century; Once On This Island
Best Supporting Actress	Jenna Noel; Caitlin Reilly; Megan Rowles; **Brittany Taylor**; Enka Taylor	--- --- --- --- ---	North Allegheny; Seton-La Salle; Serra Catholic; **Woodland Hills**; Schenley	Crazy For You; Oklahoma; Joseph... **On the 20th Century**; Once On This Island
Best Lead Actor	Christopher Conte; William Hittinger; Brendan Murnane; **Chris Peluso**; Joshua Reed	--- --- --- --- ---	Deer Lakes; Quaker Valley; Woodland Hills; **North Allegheny**; Perry	Grease; Anything Goes; On the 20th Century; **Crazy For You**; Into The Woods
Best Lead Actress	Lindsey Carothers; Kate Dorman; Jessica Hortert; Natalie Nicolian; **Chelsey Shannon**	--- --- --- --- ---	North Allegheny; Perry; Our Lady of the Sacred Heart; Perry; **Canevin Catholic**	Crazy For You; Into The Woods; Anything Goes; Into The Woods; **Pippin**
Best Musical; Budget Category I	--- --- ---	--- --- ---	**CAPA**; Our Lady of the Sacred Heart; Perry	**...Forum**; Anything Goes; Into The Woods
Best Musical; Budget Category II	--- --- ---	--- --- ---	Chartiers Valley; North Catholic; **Schenley**	The Wiz; The Pajama Game; **Once On This Island**
Best Musical; Budget Category III	--- --- ---	--- --- ---	**North Allegheny**; Pine-Richland; Woodland Hills	**Crazy For You**; My One and Only; On the 20th Century

=== 2000 nominees and winners ===
Category	Nominee	Role	School	Musical
Best Scenic Design; Budget Category I	--- --- ---	--- --- ---	CAPA; Deer Lakes; **Winchester Thurston**	Secret Garden; Lil Abner; **Grease**
Best Scenic Design; Budget Category II	--- --- ---	--- --- ---	**Canevin Catholic**; McKeesport; Steel Valley	**My Fair Lady**; Bye Bye Birdie; My Favorite Year
Best Scenic Design; Budget Category III	--- --- ---	--- --- ---	Pine-Richland; **Quaker Valley**; Woodland Hills	My Favorite Year; **Grease**; The King and I
Best Costume Design; Budget Category I	--- --- ---	--- --- ---	**CAPA**; St. Joseph; Winchester Thurston	**Secret Garden**; Joseph... Grease
Best Costume Design; Budget Category II	--- --- ---	--- --- ---	Canevin Catholic; **Perry**; Schenley	My Fair Lady; **Joseph...** Once Upon A Mattress
Best Costume Design; Budget Category III	--- --- ---	--- --- ---	Pine-Richland; **Quaker Valley**; Woodland Hills	My Favorite Year; **Grease**; The King and I
Best Lighting Design; Budget Category I	--- --- ---	--- --- ---	**CAPA**; Deer Lakes; St. Joseph	**Secret Garden**; Lil Abner; Joseph...
Best Lighting Design; Budget Category II	--- --- ---	--- --- ---	Allderdice; North Catholic; **Steel Valley**	Pippin; Guys and Dolls; **My Favorite Year**
Best Lighting Design; Budget Category III	--- --- ---	--- --- ---	**Pine-Richland**; Plum; Seton-La Salle	**My Favorite Year**; Joseph... Grease
Best All-Student Orchestra	--- --- --- --- ---	--- --- --- --- ---	**Pine-Richland**; Plum; Schenley; South Allegheny; Steel Valley	**My Favorite Year**; Joseph... Once Upon A Mattress; The Wizard of Oz; My Favorite Year
Best Choreography	--- --- --- --- ---	--- --- --- --- ---	CAPA; North Allegheny; **Quaker Valley**; Schenley; Thomas Jefferson	Secret Garden; West Side Story; **Grease**; Once Upon A Mattress; State Fair
Best Crew/ Technical Execution	--- --- --- --- ---	--- --- --- --- ---	Canevin Catholic; Quaker Valley; **Springdale**; Steel Valley; Woodland Hills	My Fair Lady; Grease; **Annie**; My Favorite Year; The King and I
Best Vocal Ensemble	--- --- --- --- ---	--- --- --- --- ---	Canevin Catholic; CAPA; Pine-Richland; **Quaker Valley**; Schenley	My Fair Lady; Secret Garden; My Favorite Year; **Grease**; Once Upon A Mattress
Best Direction	--- --- --- --- ---	--- --- --- --- ---	Canevin Catholic; CAPA; Our Lady of the Sacred Heart; **Quaker Valley**; Woodland Hills	My Fair Lady; Secret Garden; Working; **Grease**; The King and I
Best Supporting Actor	Matthew Bonner-Davis; Charles Moneypenny; Zach Nadolski; **Steven Stoyanoff III**; Vince Ventura	--- --- --- --- ---	CAPA; Quaker Valley; North Allegheny; **Baldwin**; Canevin Catholic	Secret Garden; Grease; West Side Story; **Guys and Dolls**; My Fair Lady
Best Supporting Actress	Tammi Christian; Elise Hindmarsh; Lucy Spardy; Nicole Spardy; **Sarrah Strmel**	--- --- --- --- ---	CAPA; Riverview; Our Lady of the Sacred Heart; Our Lady of the Sacred Heart; **North Allegheny**	Secret Garden; My Fair Lady; Working; Working; **West Side Story**
Best Lead Actor	**Andrew Birnie**; Larry Dailey; Chris Gardner; Josh Maszle; Michael Rizzi	--- --- --- --- ---	**Quaker Valley**; Pine-Richland; CAPA; Steel Valley; Canevin Catholic	**Grease**; My Favorite Year; Secret Garden; My Favorite Year; My Fair Lady
Best Lead Actress	**Lydia Burns**; Emily Kramer; Ashley Liebmann; Angela Machi; Chelsey Shannon	--- --- --- --- ---	**CAPA**; Winchester Thurston; Woodland Hills; Schenley; Canevin Catholic	**Secret Garden**; Grease; The King and I Once Upon A Mattress; My Fair Lady
Best Musical; Budget Category I	--- --- ---	--- --- ---	**CAPA**; Our Lady of the Sacred Heart; St. Joseph	**Secret Garden**; Working; Joseph...
Best Musical; Budget Category II	--- --- ---	--- --- ---	**Canevin Catholic**; Schenley; Steel Valley	**My Fair Lady**; Once Upon A Mattress; My Favorite Year
Best Musical; Budget Category III	--- --- ---	--- --- ---	Pine-Richland; **Quaker Valley**; Woodland Hills	My Favorite Year; **Grease**; The King and I

=== 1999 nominees and winners ===
Category	Nominee	Role	School	Musical
Best Scenic Design; Budget Category I	--- --- ---	--- --- ---	Deer Lakes; St. Joseph; **Steel Valley**	How To Succeed... Cinderella; **Anything Goes**
Best Scenic Design; Budget Category II	--- --- ---	--- --- ---	**Canevin Catholic**; Central Catholic; Thomas Jefferson	**Into The Woods**; Into the Woods; Hello Dolly
Best Scenic Design; Budget Category III	--- --- ---	--- --- ---	North Allegheny; Pine-Richland; **Woodland Hills**	42nd Street; Hello Dolly; **Pirates of Penzance**
Best Costume Design; Budget Category I	--- --- ---	--- --- ---	Our Lady of the Sacred Heart; **Steel Valley**; Winchester Thurston	Mame; **Anything Goes**; Anyone Can Whistle
Best Costume Design; Budget Category II	--- --- ---	--- --- ---	**Canevin Catholic**; Central Catholic; Thomas Jefferson	**Into The Woods**; Into the Woods; Hello Dolly
Best Costume Design; Budget Category III	--- --- ---	--- --- ---	North Allegheny; Pine-Richland; **Woodland Hills**	42nd Street; Hello Dolly; **Pirates of Penzance**
Best Lighting Design; Budget Category I	--- --- ---	--- --- ---	Perry; St. Joseph; **Steel Valley**	Lil Abner; Cinderella; **Anything Goes**
Best Lighting Design; Budget Category II	--- --- ---	--- --- ---	**Central Catholic**; North Catholic; Penn Hills	**Into The Woods**; The Music Man; Mame
Best Lighting Design; Budget Category III	--- --- ---	--- --- ---	Montour; Pine-Richland; **Woodland Hills**	South Pacific; Hello Dolly; **Pirates of Penzance**
Best All-Student Orchestra	--- --- --- --- ---	--- --- --- --- ---	**Central Catholic**; Pine-Richland; Plum; Schenley; South Allegheny	**Into The Woods**; Hello Dolly; My Favorite Year; The Wiz; Hello Dolly
Best Choreography	--- --- --- --- ---	--- --- --- --- ---	North Allegheny; Plum; Springdale; Steel Valley; **Woodland Hills**	42nd Street; My Favorite Year; Grease; Anything Goes; **Pirates of Penzance**
Best Crew/ Technical Execution	--- --- --- --- ---	--- --- --- --- ---	Baldwin; North Allegheny; South Park; Steel Valley; **Woodland Hills**	Oklahoma; 42nd Street; Oklahoma; Anything Goes; **Pirates of Penzance**
Best Vocal Ensemble	--- --- --- --- ---	--- --- --- --- ---	Canevin Catholic; North Allegheny; Plum; Steel Valley; **Woodland Hills**	Into The Woods; 42nd Street; My Favorite Year; Anything Goes; **Pirates of Penzance**
Best Direction	--- --- --- --- ---	--- --- --- --- ---	Canevin Catholic; North Allegheny; Plum; Steel Valley; **Woodland Hills**	Into The Woods; 42nd Street; My Favorite Year; Anything Goes; **Pirates of Penzance**
Best Supporting Actor	Justin Bidula; Matt Bolish; Justin Gargis; **Matthew Hydzik**; Matt Laughery	--- --- --- --- ---	Steel Valley; Bethel Park; CAPA; **Quaker Valley**; Woodland Hills	Anything Goes; Anything Goes; Violet; **Fiddler on the Roof**; Pirates of Penzance
Best Supporting Actress	Lydia Burns; Katie Campbell; Karen Clawson; **Megan Elk**; Amanda Gillespie	--- --- --- --- ---	CAPA; Seton-La Salle; Plum; **Woodland Hills**; Quaker Valley	Violet; Mack and Mabel; My Favorite Year; **Pirates of Penzance**; Fiddler On The Roof
Best Lead Actor	Liam Bonner; **Stephen Esper**; Jason Kaminski; Scott Pearson; Leo Posteraro	--- --- --- --- ---	Central Catholic; **Woodland Hills**; North Catholic; Woodland Hills; Plum	Into The Woods; **Pirates of Penzance**; The Music Man; Pirates of Penzance; My Favorite Year
Best Lead Actress	Lisa Graham; Lori Marinacci; **Courtney Mazza**; Chelsey Shannon; Sarah Strimel	--- --- --- --- ---	Quaker Valley; Seton-La Salle; **CAPA**; Canevin Catholic; North Allegheny	Fiddler On The Roof; Mack and Mabel; **Violet**; Into The Woods; 42nd Street
Best Musical; Budget Category I	--- --- ---	--- --- ---	South Allegheny; **Steel Valley**; Winchester Thurston	Hello Dolly; **Anything Goes**; Anyone Can Whistle
Best Musical; Budget Category II	--- --- ---	--- --- ---	**Canevin Catholic**; Central Catholic; Thomas Jefferson	**Into The Woods**; Into the Woods; Hello Dolly
Best Musical; Budget Category III	--- --- ---	--- --- ---	North Allegheny; Plum; **Woodland Hills**	42nd Street; My Favorite Year; **Pirates of Penzance**

=== 1998 nominees and winners ===
Category	Nominee	Role	School	Musical
Best Scenic Design; Budget Category I	--- --- ---	--- --- ---	South Park; St. Joseph; **Winchester Thurston**	Makin It; Children of Eden; **Runaways**
Best Scenic Design; Budget Category II	--- --- ---	--- --- ---	**Pine-Richland**; Quaker Valley; Steel Valley	**Crazy For You**; Pippin; Crazy For You
Best Scenic Design; Budget Category III	--- --- ---	--- --- ---	Bethel Park; Carlynton; **Woodland Hills**	Pippin; Mack and Mabel; **Man of La Mancha**
Best Costume Design; Budget Category I	--- --- ---	--- --- ---	**CAPA**; Deer Lakes; St. Joseph	**Children of Eden**; The Wizard of Oz; Children of Eden
Best Costume Design; Budget Category II	--- --- ---	--- --- ---	**Pine-Richland**; Plum; Schenley	**Crazy For You**; Guys and Dolls; Anything Goes
Best Costume Design; Budget Category III	--- --- ---	--- --- ---	Baldwin; Bethel Park; **Carlynton**	Barnum; Pippin; **Mack and Mabel**
Best Lighting Design; Budget Category I	--- --- ---	--- --- ---	**CAPA**; Perry; St. Joseph	**Children of Eden**; The Pajama Game; Children of Eden
Best Lighting Design; Budget Category II	--- --- ---	--- --- ---	North Catholic; Pine-Richland; **Seton-La Salle**	Godspell; Crazy For You; **Mame**
Best Lighting Design; Budget Category III	--- --- ---	--- --- ---	Bethel Park; Carlynton; **Woodland Hills**	Pippin; Mack and Mabel; **Man of La Mancha**
Best All-Student Orchestra	--- --- --- --- ---	--- --- --- --- ---	Bethel Park; Clairton; North Catholic; **Pine-Richland**; Steel Valley	Pippin; You're A Good Man Charlie Brown; Godspell; **Crazy For You**; Crazy For You
Best Choreography	--- --- --- --- ---	--- --- --- --- ---	CAPA; Carlynton; **Pine-Richland**; Seton-La Salle; Woodland Hills	Children of Eden; Mack and Mabel; **Crazy For You**; Mame; Man of La Mancha
Best Crew/ Technical Execution	--- --- --- --- ---	--- --- --- --- ---	Bethel Park; South Allegheny; **Seton-La Salle**; South Park; Steel Valley	Pippin; Annie; **Mame**; Anything Goes; Crazy For You
Best Vocal Ensemble	--- --- --- --- ---	--- --- --- --- ---	Bethel Park; **CAPA**; Our Lady of the Sacred Heart; Pine-Richland; Woodland Hills	Pippin; **Children of Eden**; Bye Bye Birdie; Crazy For You; Man of La Mancha
Best Direction	--- --- --- --- ---	--- --- --- --- ---	Bethel Park; CAPA; **Pine-Richland**; St. Joseph; Woodland Hills	Pippin; Children of Eden; **Crazy For You**; Children of Eden; Man of La Mancha
Best Supporting Actor	Dominic Atwater; Chris Byers; Joel Hayden; Chris Moward; **Scott Pearson**	Dominic; Tom Thumb; Van Buren; Cain; **Padre**	North Catholic; Central Catholic; Thomas Jefferson; CAPA; **Woodland Hills**	Godspell; Barnum; Damn Yankees; Children of Eden; **Man of La Mancha**
Best Supporting Actress	Kristen Cannon; **Dominique Dobson**; Danielle Foanio; Charlotte Robinson; Paula Taggart	Meg; **Joice Heth**; Berthe; Mama Noah; North Catholic	Canevin Catholic; **Central Catholic**; Bethel Park; CAPA; Quaker Valley	Damn Yankees; **Barnum**; Pippin; Children of Eden; Godspell
Best Lead Actor	Liam Bonner; **Kevin Haden**; Tim Marquette; John Sloan; Damian Vanore	Barnum; **Leading Player**; Bobby; Adam/Japeth; Applegate	Central Catholic; **Bethel Park**; Pine-Richland; CAPA; Thomas Jefferson	Barnum; **Pippin**; Crazy For You; Children of Eden; Damn Yankees
Best Lead Actress	Tonilyn Longo; Courtney Mazza; Meghan Ott; Audrey Pernell; **Danielle Vetter**	Lola; Eve; Polly; Mabel; **Mame**	Canevin Catholic; CAPA; Pine-Richland; Carlynton; **Seton-La Salle**	Damn Yankees; Children of Eden; Crazy For You; Mack and Mabel; **Mame**
Best Musical; Budget Category I	--- --- ---	--- --- ---	**CAPA**; St. Joseph; Winchester Thurston	**Children of Eden**; Children of Eden; Runaways
Best Musical; Budget Category II	--- --- ---	--- --- ---	North Catholic; **Pine-Richland**; Seton-La Salle	Godspell; **Crazy For You**; Mame
Best Musical; Budget Category III	--- --- ---	--- --- ---	Bethel Park; Montour; **Woodland Hills**	Pippin; The Wizard of Oz; **Man of La Mancha**

=== 1997 nominees and winners ===
Category	Nominee	Role	School	Musical
Best Scenic Design; Budget Category I	--- --- ---	--- --- ---	CAPA; **Deer Lakes**; South Park	Chess; **Fiddler On The Roof**; The Boy Friend
Best Scenic Design; Budget Category II	--- --- ---	--- --- ---	**Pine-Richland**; Schenley; Seton-La Salle	**Pirates of Penzance**; Leader of the Pack; How To Succeed...
Best Scenic Design; Budget Category III	--- --- ---	--- --- ---	Baldwin; West Mifflin; **Woodland Hills**	Singin In The Rain; The Wizard of Oz; **The Music Man**
Best Costume Design; Budget Category I	--- --- ---	--- --- ---	Brashear; **Deer Lakes**; St. Joseph	Hello Dolly; **Fiddler On The Roof**; Fiddler On The Roof
Best Costume Design; Budget Category II	--- --- ---	--- --- ---	Canevin Catholic; Central Catholic; **Pine-Richland**	Working; Joseph... **Pirates of Penzance**
Best Costume Design; Budget Category III	--- --- ---	--- --- ---	**Carlynton**; West Allegheny; Woodland Hills	**The Wiz**; Guys and Dolls; The Music Man
Best Lighting Design; Budget Category I	--- --- ---	--- --- ---	CAPA; Deer Lakes; **St. Joseph**	Chess; Fiddler On The Roof; **Fiddler On The Roof**
Best Lighting Design; Budget Category II	--- --- ---	--- --- ---	Elizabeth Forward; Schenley; **Seton-La Salle**	Guys and Dolls; Leader of the Pack; **How To Succeed...**
Best Lighting Design; Budget Category III	--- --- ---	--- --- ---	Carlynton; West Allegheny; **Woodland Hills**	The Wiz; Guys and Dolls; **The Music Man**
Best All-Student Orchestra	--- --- --- --- ---	--- --- --- --- ---	Bethel Park; CAPA; Central Catholic; **Pine-Richland**; South Park	Oliver; Chess; Joseph... **Pirates of Penzance**; The Boy Friend
Best Choreography	--- --- --- --- ---	--- --- --- --- ---	CAPA; Carlynton; Pine-Richland; **Schenley**; Woodland Hills	Chess; The Wiz; Pirates of Penzance; **Leader of the Pack**; The Music Man
Best Crew/ Technical Execution	--- --- --- --- ---	--- --- --- --- ---	CAPA; Carlynton; Schenley; West Allegheny; **Woodland Hills**	Chess; The Wiz; Leader of the Pack; Guys and Dolls; **The Music Man**
Best Vocal Ensemble	--- --- --- --- --- ---	--- --- --- --- --- ---	CAPA; Carlynton; Pine-Richland; **Schenley**; Winchester Thurston; Woodland Hills	Chess; The Wiz; Pirates of Penzance; **Leader of the Pack**; Guys and Dolls; The Music Man
Best Direction	--- --- --- --- ---	--- --- --- --- ---	Montour; Pine-Richland; **Schenley**; West Allegheny; Woodland Hills	Grease; Pirates of Penzance; **Leader of the Pack**; Guys and Dolls; The Music Man
Best Actor in a supporting role	Andy Barnes; Brian Carothers; David Hughey; Brent Montone; **Andy Place**	--- --- --- --- ---	Montour; Montour; CAPA; Seton-La Salle; **Schenley**	Grease; Grease; Chess; How To Succeed... **Leader of the Pack**
Best Actress in a supporting role	Christiana Craig; **Kadia Givner**; Michelle Johnson; Kaaren Terpack; Danielle Vetter	--- --- --- --- ---	Seton-La Salle; **Schenley**; CAPA; Peabody; Seton-La Salle	How to Succeed... **Leader of the Pack**; Chess; The Wiz; How to Succeed...
Best Actor in a lead role	Nick Lowery; Tim Marquette; Jordan Mueller; **Jacob Ming-Trent**; Bob Zinsmeister	--- --- --- --- ---	West Allegheny; Pine-Richland; Carlynton; **CAPA**; Montour	Guys and Dolls; Pirates of Penzance; The Wiz; **Chess**; Grease
Best Actress in a lead role	Shani Alexander; Lydia Burns; Nicole Geving; **Natalie Hatcher**; Genevieve McHoes	--- --- --- --- ---	Schenley; CAPA; West Allegheny; **Carlynton**; Central Catholic	Leader of the Pack; Chess; Guys and Dolls; **The Wiz**; Joseph...
Best Musical; Budget Category I	--- --- ---	--- --- ---	**CAPA**; Deer Lakes; St. Joseph	**Chess**; Fiddler On The Roof; Fiddler On The Roof
Best Musical; Budget Category II	--- --- ---	--- --- ---	Pine-Richland; **Schenley**; Seton-La Salle	Pirates of Penzance; **Leader of the Pack**; How To Succeed...
Best Musical; Budget Category III	--- --- --- ---	--- --- --- ---	Carlynton; Montour; West Allegheny; **Woodland Hills**	The Wiz; Grease; Guys and Dolls; **The Music Man**

=== 1996 nominees and winners ===
Category	Nominee	Role	School	Musical
Best Scenic Design; Budget Category I	--- --- ---	--- --- ---	Deer Lakes; Montour; **St. Joseph**	Shenandoah; Guys and Dolls; **Jesus Christ Superstar**
Best Scenic Design; Budget Category II	--- --- ---	--- --- ---	**CAPA**; Central Catholic; Peabody	**Weird Romance**; Little Shop Of Horrors; Hello Dolly
Best Scenic Design; Budget Category III	--- --- ---	--- --- ---	Canevin Catholic; Carlynton; **Woodland Hills**	Oklahoma; My One and Only; **The Mystery of Edwin Drood**
Best Costume Design; Budget Category I	--- --- ---	--- --- ---	**St. Joseph**; Schenley; Shadyside Academy	**Jesus Christ Superstar**; West Side Story; City of Angels
Best Costume Design; Budget Category II	--- --- ---	--- --- ---	CAPA; **Central Catholic**; Peabody	Weird Romance; **Little Shop Of Horrors**; Hello Dolly
Best Costume Design; Budget Category III	--- --- ---	--- --- ---	Canevin Catholic; Carlynton; **Woodland Hills**	Oklahoma; My One and Only; **The Mystery of Edwin Drood**
Best Lighting Design; Budget Category I	--- --- ---	--- --- ---	Montour; **St. Joseph**; Schenley	Guys and Dolls; **Jesus Christ Superstar**; West Side Story
Best Lighting Design; Budget Category II	--- --- ---	--- --- ---	CAPA; **Central Catholic**; Peabody	Weird Romance; **Little Shop Of Horrors**; Hello Dolly
Best Lighting Design; Budget Category III	--- --- ---	--- --- ---	**Canevin Catholic**; Seton-La Salle; Woodland Hills	**Oklahoma**; West Side Story; The Mystery of Edwin Drood
Best All-Student Orchestra	--- --- --- --- ---	--- --- --- --- ---	**Central Catholic**; Pine-Richland; Plum; Riverview; St. Joseph	**Little Shop of Horrors**; Bye Bye Birdie; Brigadoon; Fiddler on the Roof; Jesus Christ Superstar
Best Choreography	--- --- --- --- ---	--- --- --- --- ---	CAPA; **Carlynton**; Central Catholic; Schenley; Seton-La Salle	Weird Romance; **My One and Only**; Little Shop of Horrors; West Side Story; West Side Story
Best Crew/ Technical Execution	--- --- --- --- ---	--- --- --- --- ---	Canevin Catholic; Carlynton; Central Catholic; St. Joseph; **Woodland Hills**	Oklahoma; My One and Only; Little Shop of Horrors; Jesus Christ Superstar; **The Mystery of Edwin Drood**
Best Vocal Ensemble	--- --- --- --- ---	--- --- --- --- ---	CAPA; **Central Catholic**; Moon; Quaker Valley; Seton-La Salle	Weird Romance; **Little Shop of Horrors**; Secret Garden; West Side Story; West Side Story
Best Direction	--- --- --- --- ---	--- --- --- --- ---	Canevin Catholic; **CAPA**; Central Catholic; Quaker Valley; St. Joseph	Oklahoma; **Weird Romance**; Little Shop of Horrors; West Side Story; Jesus Christ Superstar
Best Actor in a supporting role	Andy Artz; Damien Lavara; John Sloan; Matt Smouse; **Jacen Wilkerson**	--- Daniel Gaddis; Paul --- Joe Hopkins	Peabody; CAPA; CAPA; Pine-Richland; **CAPA**	Hello Dolly; Weird Romance; Weird Romance; Bye Bye Birdie; **Weird Romance**
Best Actress in a supporting role	Rachell Abell; **Charlyn Booker**; Jessika Harper; Ginny Keyes; Danielle Vetter	--- Carol Drayton; Nola --- ---	Quaker Valley; **CAPA**; CAPA; Peabody; Seton-La Salle	West Side Story; **Weird Romance**; Weird Romance; Hello Dolly; West Side Story
Best Actor in a leading role	Chris Byers; Dave Crawford; Dave English; Jordan Mueller; **Jacob Ming-Trent**	--- --- --- --- Kevin Drayton	Central Catholic; Quaker Valley; Riverview; Carlynton; **CAPA**	Little Shop of Horrors; West Side Story; Fiddler on the Roof; My One and Only; **Weird Romance**
Best Actress in a leading role	Chelsea Boyd; Jessica Green; **Courtney Mazza**; Jennifer O'Loughlin; Erin Rhodes	Delphie --- P. Burke --- ---	CAPA; Shadyside Academy; **CAPA**; Quaker Valley; Central Catholic	Weird Romance; City of Angels; **Weird Romance**; West Side Story; Little Shop of Horrors
Best Musical; Budget Category I	--- --- ---	--- --- ---	**St. Joseph**; Schenley; Shadyside Academy	**Jesus Christ Superstar**; West Side Story; City of Angels
Best Musical; Budget Category II	--- --- ---	--- --- ---	**CAPA**; Central Catholic; Peabody	**Weird Romance**; Little Shop Of Horrors; Hello Dolly
Best Musical; Budget Category III	--- --- ---	--- --- ---	**Carlynton**; Quaker Valley; Seton-La Salle	**My One and Only**; West Side Story; West Side Story

=== 1995 nominees and winners ===
Category	Nominee	Role	School	Musical
Best Scenic Design; Budget Category I	--- --- ---	--- --- ---	CAPA; **Deer Lakes**; Schenley	Once On This Island; **Seven Brides for Seven Brothers**; Ain't Misbehavin
Best Scenic Design; Budget Category II	--- --- ---	--- --- ---	Canevin Catholic; **Central Catholic**; East Allegheny	Guys and Dolls; **1776**; Bye Bye Birdie
Best Scenic Design; Budget Category III	--- --- --- ---	--- --- --- ---	Moon; Riverview; West Allegheny; **Woodland Hills**	Hello Dolly; Once Upon A Mattress; Carousel; **Jesus Christ Superstar**
Best Costume Design; Budget Category I	--- --- ---	--- --- ---	**CAPA**; Deer Lakes; Shadyside Academy	**Once On This Island**; Seven Brides for Seven Brothers; Big River
Best Costume Design; Budget Category II	--- --- --- --- ---	--- --- --- --- ---	**Central Catholic**; East Allegheny; Plum; Quaker Valley; Thomas Jefferson	**1776**; Bye Bye Birdie; Cinderella; Into the Woods; Secret Garden
Best Costume Design; Budget Category III	--- --- ---	--- --- ---	Carlynton; West Allegheny; **Woodland Hills**	42nd Street; Carousel; **Jesus Christ Superstar**
Best Lighting Design; Budget Category I	--- --- --- ---	--- --- --- ---	CAPA; **Deer Lakes**; Steel Valley; Shadyside Academy	Once On This Island; **Seven Brides for Seven Brothers**; Oklahoma; Big River
Best Lighting Design; Budget Category II	--- --- ---	--- --- ---	Canevin Catholic; **Central Catholic**; East Allegheny	Guys and Dolls; **1776**; Bye Bye Birdie
Best Lighting Design; Budget Category III	--- --- ---	--- --- ---	Carlynton; West Allegheny; **Woodland Hills**	42nd Street; Carousel; **Jesus Christ Superstar**
Best All-Student Orchestra	--- --- --- --- ---	--- --- --- --- ---	Bethel Park; **CAPA**; Central Catholic; Moon; St. Joseph	South Pacific; **Once On This Island**; 1776; Fiddler on the Roof; Cotton Patch Gospel
Best Choreography	--- --- --- --- ---	--- --- --- --- ---	CAPA; **Carlynton**; Seton-La Salle; West Allegheny; Woodland Hills	Once On This Island; **42nd Street**; Smile; Carousel; Jesus Christ Superstar
Best Crew/ Technical Execution	--- --- --- --- ---	--- --- --- --- ---	Carlynton; Schenley; Seton-La Salle; Shadyside Academy; **Woodland Hills**	42nd Street; Aint Misbehavin; Smile; Big River; **Jesus Christ Superstar**
Best Direction	--- --- --- --- ---	--- --- --- --- ---	CAPA; Central Catholic; Shadyside Academy; West Allegheny; **Woodland Hills**	Once On This Island; 1776; Big River; Carousel; **Jesus Christ Superstar**
Best Actor in a supporting role	Jacob Ming-Trent; Justin Morris; **Michael Casey**; David Crawford; Austin Ireland	Ton-Ton; Billy; **John Dickinson**; Cinderella's Prince; Mana	CAPA; Carlynton; **Central Catholic**; Quaker Valley; Seton-La Salle	Once On This Island; 42nd Street; **1776**; Into The Woods; Smile
Best Actress in a supporting role	Tanika Harris; Rebecca Lee; Catherine Craig; Katherine Kennedy; **Danielle Vetter**	Mama; Maggie; Robin; Brenda; **Maria**	CAPA; Carlynton; Seton-La Salle; Seton-La Salle; **Seton-La Salle**	Once On This Island; 42nd Street; Smile; Smile; **Smile**
Best Actor in a lead role	Shelby Shannon; Jason Notaro; Zachary Quinto; **Vince Ponder**; Eric Rieger	Nathan; Julian; John Adams; **Jim**; Billy	Canevin Catholic; Carlynton; Central Catholic; **Shadyside Academy**; West Allegheny	Guys and Dolls; 42nd Street; 1776; **Big River**; Carousel
Best Actress in a lead role	**Jackie Urso**; Jennifer O-Loughlin; Molly Sander; Bianca Lucente; Courtney D'Ono	**Peggy**; Cinderella; Doria; Julie; Judas	**Carlynton**; Quaker Valley; Seton-La Salle; West Allegheny; Woodland Hills	**42nd Street**; Into The Woods; Smile; Carousel; Jesus Christ Superstar
Best Musical; Budget Category I	--- --- ---	--- --- ---	**CAPA**; Deer Lakes; Shadyside Academy	**Once On This Island**; Seven Brides for Seven Brothers; Big River
Best Musical; Budget Category II	--- --- ---	--- --- ---	Canevin Catholic; East Allegheny; **Quaker Valley**	Guys and Dolls; Bye Bye Birdie; **Into the Woods**
Best Musical; Budget Category III	--- --- --- ---	--- --- --- ---	Carlynton; **Seton-La Salle**; West Allegheny; Woodland Hills	42nd Street; **Smile**; Carousel; Jesus Christ Superstar

=== 1994 nominees and winners ===
Category	Nominee	Role	School	Musical
Best Scenic Design; Budget Category I	--- --- ---	--- --- ---	Central Catholic; Schenley; **Shadyside Academy**	Pirates of Penzance; Once On This Island; **Once On This Island**
Best Scenic Design; Budget Category II	--- --- ---	--- --- ---	Canevin Catholic; Elizabeth Forward; **Quaker Valley**	Me and My Girl; Oliver; **Once Upon A Mattress**
Best Scenic Design; Budget Category III	--- --- ---	--- --- ---	**Carlynton**; North Hills; Woodland Hills	**Joseph...** Oliver; Annie Get Your Gun
Best Costume Design; Budget Category I	--- --- ---	--- --- ---	Central Catholic; Moon; **Shadyside Academy**	Pirates of Penzance; Joseph... **Once On This Island**
Best Costume Design; Budget Category II	--- --- ---	--- --- ---	Canevin Catholic; Pine-Richland; **Quaker Valley**	Me and My Girl; The Music Man; **Once Upon A Mattress**
Best Costume Design; Budget Category III	--- --- ---	--- --- ---	**Carlynton**; Seton-La Salle; Woodland Hills	**Joseph...** My Favorite Year; Annie Get Your Gun
Best Lighting Design; Budget Category I	--- --- ---	--- --- ---	Central Catholic; Schenley; **Shadyside Academy**	Pirates of Penzance; Once On This Island; **Once On This Island**
Best Lighting Design; Budget Category II	--- --- ---	--- --- ---	**Canevin Catholic**; Pine-Richland; Shaler	**Me and My Girl**; The Music Man; Once Upon A Mattress
Best Lighting Design; Budget Category III	--- --- ---	--- --- ---	Carlynton; Seton-La Salle; **Woodland Hills**	Joseph... My Favorite Year; **Annie Get Your Gun**
Best All-Student Orchestra	--- --- ---	--- --- ---	Central Catholic; **North Catholic**; Winchester Thurston	Pirates of Penzance; **The Boy Friend**; Joseph...
Best Choreography	--- --- --- --- ---	--- --- --- --- ---	Carlynton; **Schenley**; Seton-La Salle; Shadyside Academy; Woodland Hills	Joseph... **Once On This Island**; My Favorite Year; Once On This Island; Annie Get Your Gun
Best Crew/ Technical Execution	--- --- --- --- ---	--- --- --- --- ---	Carlynton; Deer Parks; **Quaker Valley**; Seton-La Salle; Woodland Hills	Joseph... Annie Get Your Gun; **Once Upon A Mattress**; My Favorite Year; Annie Get Your Gun
Best Direction	--- --- --- --- ---	--- --- --- --- ---	Canevin Catholic; Central Catholic; **Carlynton**; Schenley; Shadyside Academy	Me and My Girl; Pirates of Penzance; **Joseph...** Once On This Island; Once On This Island
Best Supporting Actor	Kevin Finn; Justin Morris; **Zachary Quinto**; Shelby Shannon; Jeff Waag	Artful Dodger; Pharaoh; **Major General Stanley**; Sir John; Lord Brockhurst	North Hills; Carlynton; **Central Catholic**; Canevin Catholic; North Catholic	Oliver; Joseph... **Pirates of Penzance**; Me and My Girl; The Boy Friend
Best Supporting Actress	Dana Greco; Meighan Lloyd; **Brigid Ryan**; Julie Vara; Jamie Wick	Artful Dodger; Belle Mae Carroca; **Queen Aggravain**; Alice Miller; Lady Jacqueline	Elizabeth Forward; Seton-La Salle; **Shaler**; Seton-La Salle; Canevin Catholic	Oliver; My Favorite Year; **Once Upon A Mattress**; My Favorite Year; Me and My Girl
Best Lead Actor	Christopher Eccher; Michael Martin; **Michael McGurk**; Jason Notaro; Dan Zitelli	Bill Snibson; Fagan; **Benjy Stone**; Joseph; Pirate King	Canevin Catholic; North Hills; **Seton-La Salle**; Carlynton; Central Catholic	Me and My Girl; Oliver; **My Favorite Year**; Joseph... Pirates of Penzance
Best Lead Actress	**Sabrina Gutierrez**; Jeanne Kim; Erin McAdams; Jackie Urso; Courtney Zilweger	**Ti-Moune**; Ti-Moune; Nancy; Narrator; Marian	**Schenley**; Shadyside Academy; Elizabeth Forward; Carlynton; Pine-Richland	**Once On This Island**; Once On This Island; Oliver; Joseph... The Music Man
Best Musical; Budget Category I	--- --- ---	--- --- ---	Central Catholic; Schenley; **Shadyside Academy**	Pirates of Penzance; Once On This Island; **Once On This Island**
Best Musical; Budget Category II	--- --- ---	--- --- ---	**Canevin Catholic**; Quaker Valley; Shaler	**Me and My Girl**; Once Upon A Mattress; Once Upon A Mattress
Best Musical; Budget Category III	--- --- ---	--- --- ---	**Carlynton**; Seton-La Salle; Woodland Hills	**Joseph...** My Favorite Year; Annie Get Your Gun

=== 1993 nominees and winners ===
Category	Nominee	Role	School	Musical
Best Scenic Design; Budget Category I	--- --- ---	--- --- ---	Central Catholic; **Deer Lakes**; Winchester Thurston	Once Upon A Mattress; **Oklahoma**; Little Mary Sunshine
Best Scenic Design; Budget Category II	--- --- ---	--- --- ---	**Canevin Catholic**; Carlynton; Peabody	**Sound of Music**; Godspell; Into the Woods
Best Scenic Design; Budget Category III	--- --- ---	--- --- ---	Gateway; North Hills; **Woodland Hills**	West Side Story; Guys and Dolls; **Peter Pan**
Best Costume Design; Budget Category I	--- --- ---	--- --- ---	Central Catholic; Deer Lakes; **Schenley**	Once Upon A Mattress; Oklahoma; **Guys and Dolls**
Best Costume Design; Budget Category II	--- --- ---	--- --- ---	Canevin Catholic; **Carlynton**; Peabody	Sound of Music; **Godspell**; Into the Woods
Best Costume Design; Budget Category III	--- --- ---	--- --- ---	Gateway; West Allegheny; **Woodland Hills**	West Side Story; Oklahoma; **Peter Pan**
Best Lighting Design; Budget Category I	--- --- ---	--- --- ---	St. Joseph; **Schenley**; Winchester Thurston	Jesus Christ Superstar; **Guys and Dolls**; Little Mary Sunshine
Best Lighting Design; Budget Category II	--- --- ---	--- --- ---	**Canevin Catholic**; Carlynton; Peabody	**Sound of Music**; Godspell; Into the Woods
Best Lighting Design; Budget Category III	--- --- ---	--- --- ---	Gateway; West Allegheny; **Woodland Hills**	West Side Story; Oklahoma; **Peter Pan**
Best All-Student Orchestra	--- --- ---	--- --- ---	Canevin Catholic; North Allegheny; **North Catholic**	Sound of Music; Hello Dolly; **Pippin**
Best Choreography	--- --- --- --- ---	--- --- --- --- ---	Carlynton; Gateway; St. Joseph; Schenley; **Woodland Hills**	Godspell; West Side Story; Jesus Christ Superstar; Guys and Dolls; **Peter Pan**
Best Crew/ Technical Execution	--- --- --- --- ---	--- --- --- --- ---	Canevin Catholic; Gateway; Seton-La Salle; Shaler; **Woodland Hills**	Sound of Music; West Side Story; Guys and Dolls; The Music Man; **Peter Pan**
Best Direction	--- --- --- --- ---	--- --- --- --- ---	Canevin Catholic; Carlynton; Gateway; Peabody; **Woodland Hills**	Sound of Music; Godspell; West Side Story; Into The Woods; **Peter Pan**
Best Actor in a supporting role	John Bard; Kevin Hunt; **Michael McGurk**; Don Mudrick; Yarone Zober	--- --- --- --- ---	Plum; Gateway; **Seton-La Salle**; West Allegheny; Peabody	Oklahoma; West Side Story; **Guys and Dolls**; Oklahoma; Into The Woods
Best Actress in a supporting role	Maddie Carver; Sylvia Cosnotti; **Danielle Garner**; Melanie Moore; Brigid Ryan	--- --- --- --- ---	Riverview; Plum; **Gateway**; Peabody; Shaler	Bye Bye Birdie; Oklahoma; **West Side Story**; Into The Woods; The Music Man
Best Actor in a lead role	Mark Cadungog; **Kevin Hanrahan**; Jeff Hornak; Eric Rieger; Brian Salter	--- --- --- --- ---	St. Joseph; **Shaler**; Woodland Hills; West Allegheny; Schenley	Jesus Christ Superstar; **The Music Man**; Peter Pan; Oklahoma; Guys and Dolls
Best Actress in a lead role	Katie Byrd; Gretchen Cleevely; **Lisa Marinacci**; Lyn Philistine; Rosie Renn	--- --- --- --- ---	Canevin Catholic; Woodland Hills; **Seton-La Salle**; Seton-La Salle; Gateway	Sound of Music; Peter Pan; **Guys and Dolls**; Guys and Dolls; West Side Story
Best Musical; Budget Category I	--- --- ---	--- --- ---	St. Joseph; **Schenley**; Winchester Thurston	Jesus Christ Superstar; **Guys and Dolls**; Little Mary Sunshine
Best Musical; Budget Category II	--- --- ---	--- --- ---	Canevin Catholic; **Carlynton**; Peabody	Sound of Music; **Godspell**; Into the Woods
Best Musical; Budget Category III	--- --- ---	--- --- ---	Gateway; West Allegheny; **Woodland Hills**	West Side Story; Oklahoma; **Peter Pan**

=== 1992 nominees and winners ===
Category	Nominee	Role	School	Musical
Best Scenic Design; Lowest Budget	--- --- ---	--- --- ---	Deer Lakes; Schenley; **Shadyside Academy**	The Wizard of Oz; Aint Misbehavin; **Pippin**
Best Scenic Design; Middle Budget	--- --- ---	--- --- ---	**Canevin Catholic**; Shaler; Thomas Jefferson	**Into The Woods**; Sound of Music; Once Upon A Mattress
Best Scenic Design; Highest Budget	--- --- ---	--- --- ---	Gateway; Keystone Oaks; **Woodland Hills**	The Boy Friend; The Wizard of Oz; **Lil Abner**
Best Costume Design; Lowest Budget	--- --- ---	--- --- ---	Deer Lakes; **Schenley**; Shadyside Academy	The Wizard of Oz; **Aint Misbehavin**; Pippin
Best Costume Design; Middle Budget	--- --- ---	--- --- ---	Quaker Valley; Plum; **Canevin Catholic**	The Boy Friend; Camelot; **Into The Woods**
Best Costume Design; Highest Budget	--- --- ---	--- --- ---	Gateway; Keystone Oaks; **Woodland Hills**	The Boy Friend; The Wizard of Oz; **Lil Abner**
Best Lighting Design; Lowest Budget	--- --- ---	--- --- ---	CAPA; Deer Lakes; **Shadyside Academy**	Anything Goes; The Wizard of Oz; **Pippin**
Best Lighting Design; Middle Budget	--- --- ---	--- --- ---	**Canevin Catholic**; Shaler; Thomas Jefferson	**Into The Woods**; Sound of Music; Once Upon A Mattress
Best Lighting Design; Highest Budget	--- --- ---	--- --- ---	East Allegheny; Gateway; **Woodland Hills**	42nd Street; The Boy Friend; **Lil Abner**
Best All-Student Orchestra	--- --- ---	--- --- ---	North Allegheny; **North Catholic**; Thomas Jefferson	Annie Get Your Gun; **Grease**; Once Upon A Mattress
Best Choreography	--- --- --- --- ---	--- --- --- --- ---	East Allegheny; **Gateway**; Schenley; Shadyside Academy; Woodland Hills	42nd Street; **The Boy Friend**; Aint Misbehavin; Pippin; Lil Abner
Best Crew/ Technical Execution	--- --- --- --- ---	--- --- --- --- ---	North Hills; Deer Lakes; Gateway; Thomas Jefferson; **Woodland Hills**	South Pacific; The Wizard of Oz; The Boy Friend; Once Upon A Mattress; **Lil Abner**
Best Direction	--- --- --- --- ---	--- --- --- --- ---	Canevin Catholic; Deer Lakes; Gateway; Shadyside Academy; **Woodland Hills**	Into The Woods; The Wizard of Oz; The Boy Friend; Pippin; **Lil Abner**
Best Supporting Actor	Jamie Caridi; Chris DeMarco; **Kevin Hanrahan**; Michael Keating; Brian Thomas	Roger; Pappy Yokum; **Max**; Scarecrow; Evil Eye Fleagle	North Catholic; Woodland Hills; **Shaler**; Keystone Oaks; Woodland Hills	Grease; Lil Abner; **Sound of Music**; The Wizard of Oz; Lil Abner
Best Supporting Actress	Melissa Cardello; Gretchen Cleevely; **Danielle Garner**; Jennifer Halterlein; Merica Paris	Bonnie; Mammy Yokum; **Maisie**; Meg; Catherine	CAPA; Woodland Hills; **Gateway**; Penn Hills; Shadyside Academy	Anything Goes; Lil Abner; **The Boy Friend**; Brigadoon; Pippin
Best Lead Actor	Wayne Chiaramonte; J. Alex Cordaro; **Bruce Harris**; Vincent Ponder Jr; Eric Watts	Emile; Pippin; **Lead Singer**; Leading Player; Mr. Applegate	North Hills; Shadyside Academy; **Schenley**; Shadyside Academy; Allderdice	South Pacific; Pippin; **Aint Misbehavin**; Pippin; Damn Yankees
Best Lead Actress	Emily Belo; Erin Locante; Christina McCann; **Meagan Schu**; Amy Vogel	Annie; Sandy; Polly; **Nellie**; Princess Winnifred	North Allegheny; North Catholic; Gateway; **North Hills**; Thomas Jefferson	Annie; Grease; The Boy Friend; **South Pacific**; Once Upon A Mattress
Best Musical; Lowest	--- --- ---	--- --- ---	Deer Lakes; Schenley; **Shadyside Academy**	The Wizard of Oz; Aint Misbehavin; **Pippin**
Best Musical; Middle Budget	--- --- ---	--- --- ---	**Canevin Catholic**; Shaler; Thomas Jefferson	**Into The Woods**; Sound of Music; Once Upon A Mattress
Best Musical; Highest Budget	--- --- ---	--- --- ---	Gateway; Keystone Oaks; **Woodland Hills**	The Boy Friend; The Wizard of Oz; **Lil Abner**

=== 1991 nominees and winners ===
Category	Nominee	Role	School	Musical
Best Scenic Design; Lowest Budget	--- --- ---	--- --- ---	**East Allegheny**; North Allegheny; Penn Hills	**Annie**; My Fair Lady; Once Upon A Mattress
Best Scenic Design; Medium Budget	--- --- ---	--- --- ---	**Fox Chapel**; North Hills; Shaler	**Bye Bye Birdie**; The Pajama Game; Annie
Best Scenic Design; High Budget	--- --- ---	--- --- ---	Keystone Oaks; Upper St. Clair; **Woodland Hills**	Anything Goes; Oklahoma; **Guys and Dolls**
Best Costume Design; Lowest Budget	--- --- ---	--- --- ---	Chartiers Valley; **East Allegheny**; Shaler Area	Chicago; **Annie**; Annie
Best Costume Design; Medium Budget	--- --- ---	--- --- ---	Fox Chapel; **North Allegheny**; Penn Hills	Bye Bye Birdie; **My Fair Lady**; Once Upon A Mattress
Best Costume Design; Highest Budget	--- --- ---	--- --- ---	Keystone Oaks; Upper St. Clair; **Woodland Hills**	Anything Goes; Oklahoma; **Guys and Dolls**
Best Lighting Design; Lowest Budget	--- --- ---	--- --- ---	Chartiers Valley; Fox Chapel; **Plum**	Chicago; Bye Bye Birdie; Fiddler On The Roof''
Best Lighting Design; Medium Budget	--- --- ---	--- --- ---	East Allegheny; **Keystone Oaks**; North Hills	Annie; **Anything Goes**; The Pajama Game
Best Lighting Design; High Budget	--- --- ---	--- --- ---	**Shaler**; Upper St. Clair; Woodland Hills	**Annie**; Aint Misbehavin; Guys and Dolls
Best Choreographer	Renee Ann Keil --- --- --- **Tiffany Ellis**	--- --- --- --- ---	Chartiers Valley; East Allegheny; Fox Chapel; Plum; **Schenley**	Chicago; Annie; Bye Bye Birdie; Fiddler On The Roof; **The All Night Strut**
Best Crew/Technical Execution	--- --- --- --- ---	--- --- --- --- ---	East Allegheny; Fox Chapel; Keystone Oaks; North Hills; **Woodland Hills**	Annie; Bye Bye Birdie; Anything Goes; The Pajama Game; **Guys and Dolls**
Best Direction	--- --- --- --- ---	--- --- --- --- ---	East Allegheny; Fox Chapel; Keystone Oaks; Plum; **Woodland Hills**	Annie; Bye Bye Birdie; Anything Goes; Fiddler On The Roof; **Guys and Dolls**
Best Supporting Actor	Kevin Hanrahan; Mike Keating; Tony Loverti; Josh Reed; **Richard Wooley**	--- --- --- --- **Nicely Nicely Johnson**	Shaler; Keystone Oaks; North Allegheny; Quaker Valley; **Woodland Hills**	Annie; Anything Goes; My Fair Lady; Working; **Guys and Dolls**
Best Supporting Actress	Megan McCarthy; Melissa Richtar; Tracy Saula; Amy Smith; **Melissa Yankello**	--- --- --- --- Dolores	Fox Chapel; Keystone Oaks; East Allegheny; Quaker Valley; **Quaker Valley**	Bye Bye Birdie; Anything Goes; Annie; Working; **Working**
Best Lead Actor	Dan Brown; **Gregory Esper**; Chris Lynch; John McCarthy; Jason Nairn; Eric Watts	Daddy Warbucks; **Sky Masterson**; Henry Higgins; Albert; Tevye; Prince Dauntless	East Allegheny; **Woodland Hills**; North Allegheny; Fox Chapel; Plum; Penn Hills	Annie; **Guys and Dolls**; My Fair Lady; Bye Bye Birdie; Fiddler On The Roof; Once Upon A Mattress
Best Lead Actress	Kristen Arnold; Sonya Duree; Gaelen Gilliland; Ellen Patalski; **Amanda Temple**	Eliza Doolittle; Annie; Rosie; Golde; **Miss Adelaide**	North Allegheny; East Allegheny; Fox Chapel; Plum; **Woodland Hills**	My Fair Lady; Annie; Bye Bye Birdie; Fiddler On The Roof; **Guys and Dolls**
Best Musical	--- --- --- --- ---	--- --- --- --- ---	East Allegheny; Fox Chapel; Keystone Oaks; Schenley; **Woodland Hills**	Annie; Bye Bye Birdie; Anything Goes; The All Night Strut; **Guys and Dolls**
