= Pennsylvania's 17th congressional district =

U.S. House district for Pennsylvania

Coordinates: 40°31′51″N 80°10′9″W

- Interactive map of district boundaries since January 3, 2023 (Allegheny County outlined in red)
- Representative: Chris Deluzio; D–Aspinwall
- Population (2025): 748,546
- Median household income: $89,131
- Ethnicity: 82.7% White; 7.0% Black; 6.1% Two or more races; 3.1% Asian; 2.6% Hispanic; 0.9% other
- Cook PVI: D+3

Pennsylvania's 17th congressional district is located in southwestern Pennsylvania, which includes the entirety of Beaver County and the northwestern parts of Allegheny County not part of the 12th district. It has been represented since January 3, 2023 by Democrat Chris Deluzio.

In January 2018, the Supreme Court of Pennsylvania ruled that the 2011 map violated the state constitution and redrew it on February 18, 2018. What was the 17th district, which had been anchored in Northeast Pennsylvania, was modified to become the 9th district, and the old 12th district likewise became the 17th, for the 2018 elections and representation thereafter until the current map was ordered on February 23, 2022. In the 2020 redistricting cycle, its portion of Butler County, including Cranberry Township, was removed from the district, while it gained some eastern suburbs of Pittsburgh, such as Forest Hills and Wilkinsburg.

== Recent election results from statewide races ==
Year	Office	Results
2008	President	Obama 50% - 49%
2008	Attorney General	Corbett 60% - 40%
2008	Auditor General	Wagner 68% - 32%
2010	Senate	Toomey 52% - 48%
2010	Governor	Corbett 56% - 44%
2012	President	Romney 50.4% - 49.6%
2012	Senate	Casey Jr. 53% - 47%
2014	Governor	Wolf 51% - 49%
2016	President	Clinton 49% - 48%
2016	Senate	Toomey 48% - 47%
2016	Attorney General	Shapiro 52% - 48%
2016	Auditor General	DePasquale 55% - 40%
2016	Treasurer	Torsella 53% - 41%
2018	Senate	Casey Jr. 59% - 39%
2018	Governor	Wolf 61% - 38%
2020	President	Biden 52% - 46%
2020	Attorney General	Shapiro 56% - 42%
2020	Auditor General	Ahmad 49% - 47%
2020	Treasurer	Torsella 50% - 46%
2022	Senate	Fetterman 56% - 42%
2022	Governor	Shapiro 62% - 36%
2024	President	Harris 52% - 47%
2024	Senate	Casey Jr. 52% - 45%
2024	Attorney General	DePasquale 51% - 46%
2024	Auditor General	Kenyatta 49% - 48%
2024	Treasurer	McClelland 49% - 48%

== Counties and municipalities ==
Allegheny County (83)

Aleppo Township, Aspinwall, Avalon, Baldwin Township, Bell Acres, Bellevue, Ben Avon, Ben Avon Heights, Blawnox, Brackenridge, Bradford Woods, Braddock Hills, Carnegie, Castle Shannon, Cheswick, Churchill, Collier Township, Coraopolis, Crafton, Dormont, East Deer Township, Edgewood, Edgeworth, Emsworth, Etna, Fawn Township, Findlay Township, Forest Hills, Fox Chapel, Franklin Park, Frazer Township, Glenfield, Glen Osborne, Green Tree, Hampton Township, Harrison Township, Harmar Township, Haysville, Heidelberg, Indiana Township, Ingram, Kennedy Township, Kilbuck Township, Leetsdale, Leet Township, Marshall Township, McCandless, McDonald, McKees Rocks, Millvale, Moon Township, Mt. Lebanon, Neville Township, North Fayette Township, Oakdale, Oakmont, O'Hara Township, Ohio Township, Penn Hills, Pennsbury Village, Pine Township, Reserve Township, Richland Township, Robinson Township, Rosslyn Farms, Ross Township, Scott Township, Sewickley, Sewickley Heights, Sewickley Hills, Shaler Township, Sharpsburg, Springdale Borough, Springdale Township, South Fayette Township, Stowe Township, Swissvale (part; also 12th), Tarentum, Thornburg, Verona, West Deer Township, West View, Wilkinsburg

Beaver County (55)

All 55 municipalities

== List of members representing the district ==
Because congressional districts are reconfigured and renumbered every 10 years (and occasionally at other times), the following chart displays each time Pennsylvania's districts were changed.

Representative	Party	Years	Cong ress	Electoral history	Counties
District established March 4, 1823
George Plumer (Robbstown)	Jacksonian; Democratic-Republican	March 4, 1823 – March 3, 1825	18th 19th	Redistricted from the 11th district and re-elected in 1822. Re-elected in 1824. Retired.	1823–1833 [data missing]
George Plumer (Robbstown)	Jacksonian	March 4, 1825 – March 3, 1827	18th 19th	Redistricted from the 11th district and re-elected in 1822. Re-elected in 1824. Retired.	1823–1833 [data missing]
Richard Coulter (Greensburg)	Jacksonian	March 4, 1827 – March 3, 1833	20th 21st 22nd	Elected in 1826. Re-elected in 1828. Re-elected in 1830. Redistricted to the 19th district.	1823–1833 [data missing]
John Laporte (Asylum)	Jacksonian	March 4, 1833 – March 3, 1837	23rd 24th	Elected in 1832. Re-elected in 1834. Retired.	1833–1843 [data missing]
Samuel Wells Morris (Wellsboro)	Democratic	March 4, 1837 – March 3, 1841	25th 26th	Elected in 1836. Re-elected in 1838. Retired.	1833–1843 [data missing]
Davis Dimock Jr. (Montrose)	Democratic	March 4, 1841 – January 13, 1842	27th	Elected in 1840. Died.	1833–1843 [data missing]
Vacant		January 13, 1842 – March 18, 1842	27th		1833–1843 [data missing]
Almon H. Read (Montrose)	Democratic	March 18, 1842 – March 3, 1843	27th	Elected to finish Dimock Jr.'s term. Redistricted to the 12th district.	1833–1843 [data missing]
James Irvin (Milesburg)	Whig	March 4, 1843 – March 3, 1845	28th	Redistricted from the 14th district and re-elected in 1843. [data missing]	[data missing]
John Blanchard (Bellefonte)	Whig	March 4, 1845 – March 3, 1849	29th 30th	Elected in 1844. Re-elected in 1846. [data missing]	[data missing]
Samuel Calvin (Hollidaysburg)	Whig	March 4, 1849 – March 3, 1851	31st	Elected in 1848. Retired.	[data missing]
Andrew Parker (Mifflintown)	Democratic	March 4, 1851 – March 3, 1853	32nd	Elected in 1850. [data missing]	[data missing]
Samuel L. Russell (Bedford)	Whig	March 4, 1853 – March 3, 1855	33rd	Elected in 1852. Retired.	[data missing]
David Fullerton Robison (Chambersburg)	Opposition	March 4, 1855 – March 3, 1857	34th	Elected in 1854. Lost re-election.	[data missing]
Wilson Reilly (Chambersburg)	Democratic	March 4, 1857 – March 3, 1859	35th	Elected in 1856. Lost re-election.	[data missing]
Edward McPherson (Gettysburg)	Republican	March 4, 1859 – March 3, 1863	36th 37th	Elected in 1858. Re-elected in 1860. Lost re-election.	[data missing]
Archibald McAllister (Springfield Furnace)	Democratic	March 4, 1863 – March 3, 1865	38th	Elected in 1862. Retired.	[data missing]
Abraham A. Barker (Edenburg)	Republican	March 4, 1865 – March 3, 1867	39th	Elected in 1864. Lost re-election.	[data missing]
Daniel J. Morrell (Johnstown)	Republican	March 4, 1867 – March 3, 1871	40th 41st	Elected in 1866. Re-elected in 1868. Lost re-election.	[data missing]
Robert M. Speer (Huntingdon)	Democratic	March 4, 1871 – March 3, 1875	42nd 43rd	Elected in 1870. Re-elected in 1872. Retired.	[data missing]
Robert M. Speer (Huntingdon)	Democratic	March 4, 1871 – March 3, 1875	42nd 43rd	Elected in 1870. Re-elected in 1872. Retired.	[data missing]
John Reilly (Altoona)	Democratic	March 4, 1875 – March 3, 1877	44th	Elected in 1874. Lost re-election.	[data missing]
Jacob M. Campbell (Johnstown)	Republican	March 4, 1877 – March 3, 1879	45th	Elected in 1876. Lost re-election.	[data missing]
Alexander H. Coffroth (Somerset)	Democratic	March 4, 1879 – March 3, 1881	46th	Elected in 1878. [data missing]	[data missing]
Jacob M. Campbell (Johnstown)	Republican	March 4, 1881 – March 3, 1887	47th 48th 49th	Elected in 1880. Re-elected in 1882. Re-elected in 1884. Lost re-election.	[data missing]
Edward Scull (Somerset)	Republican	March 4, 1887 – March 3, 1889	50th	Elected in 1886. Redistricted to the 20th Congressional District.	
Charles R. Buckalew (Bloomsburg)	Democratic	March 4, 1889 – March 3, 1891	51st	Redistricted from the 11th district and re-elected in 1888. [data missing]	[data missing]
Simon Peter Wolverton (Sunbury)	Democratic	March 4, 1891 – March 3, 1893	52nd	Elected in 1890. [data missing]	[data missing]
Simon Peter Wolverton (Sunbury)	Democratic	March 4, 1893 – March 3, 1895	53rd	Elected in 1892. Retired.	[data missing]
Monroe Henry Kulp (Shamokin)	Republican	March 4, 1895 – March 3, 1899	54th 55th	Elected in 1894. Re-elected in 1896. Lost re-election.	[data missing]
Rufus King Polk (Danville)	Democratic	March 4, 1899 – March 5, 1902	56th 57th	Elected in 1898. Re-elected in 1900. Died.	[data missing]
Vacant		March 5, 1902 – November 4, 1902	57th		[data missing]
Alexander Billmeyer (Washingtonville)	Democratic	November 4, 1902 – March 3, 1903	57th	Elected to finish Polk's term. Retired.	[data missing]
Thaddeus Maclay Mahon (Chambersburg)	Republican	March 4, 1903 – March 3, 1907	58th 59th	Redistricted from the 18th district and re-elected in 1902. Re-elected in 1904. Retired.	[data missing]
Benjamin K. Focht (Lewisburg)	Republican	March 4, 1907 – March 3, 1913	60th 61st 62nd	Elected in 1906. Re-elected in 1908. Re-elected in 1910. Lost re-election.	[data missing]
Franklin Lewis Dershem (Lewisburg)	Democratic	March 4, 1913 – March 3, 1915	63rd	Elected in 1912. Lost re-election.	[data missing]
Benjamin K. Focht (Lewisburg)	Republican	March 4, 1915 – March 3, 1923	64th 65th 66th 67th	Elected in 1914. Re-elected in 1916. Re-elected in 1918. Re-elected in 1920. Lost re-election.	[data missing]
Herbert W. Cummings (Sunbury)	Democratic	March 4, 1923 – March 3, 1925	68th	Elected in 1922. Lost re-election.	[data missing]
Frederick W. Magrady (Mount Carmel)	Republican	March 4, 1925 – March 3, 1933	69th 70th 71st 72nd	Elected in 1924. Re-elected in 1926. Re-elected in 1928. Re-elected in 1930. Lost re-election.	[data missing]
J. William Ditter (Ambler)	Republican	March 4, 1933 – November 21, 1943	73rd 74th 75th 76th 77th 78th	Elected in 1932. Re-elected in 1934. Re-elected in 1936. Re-elected in 1938. Re-elected in 1940. Re-elected in 1942. Died.	[data missing]
J. William Ditter (Ambler)	Republican	March 4, 1933 – November 21, 1943	73rd 74th 75th 76th 77th 78th	Elected in 1932. Re-elected in 1934. Re-elected in 1936. Re-elected in 1938. Re-elected in 1940. Re-elected in 1942. Died.	[data missing]
Vacant		November 21, 1943 – January 18, 1944	78th		[data missing]
Samuel K. McConnell Jr. (Penn Wynne)	Republican	January 18, 1944 – January 3, 1945	78th	Elected to finish Ditter's term. Redistricted to the 16th district.	[data missing]
Richard M. Simpson (Huntingdon)	Republican	January 3, 1945 – January 3, 1953	79th 80th 81st 82nd	Redistricted from the 18th district and re-elected in 1944. Re-elected in 1946. Re-elected in 1948. Re-elected in 1950. Redistricted to the 18th district.	[data missing]
Alvin Bush (Muncy)	Republican	January 3, 1953 – November 5, 1959	83rd 84th 85th 86th	Redistricted from the 15th district and re-elected in 1952. Re-elected in 1954. Re-elected in 1956. Re-elected in 1958. Died.	[data missing]
Vacant		November 5, 1959 – April 26, 1960	86th		[data missing]
Herman T. Schneebeli (Williamsport)	Republican	April 26, 1960 – January 3, 1977	86th 87th 88th 89th 90th 91st 92nd 93rd 94th	Elected to finish Bush's term. Re-elected in 1960. Re-elected in 1962. Re-elected in 1964. Re-elected in 1966. Re-elected in 1968. Re-elected in 1970. Re-elected in 1972. Re-elected in 1974. Retired.	[data missing]
Herman T. Schneebeli (Williamsport)	Republican	April 26, 1960 – January 3, 1977	86th 87th 88th 89th 90th 91st 92nd 93rd 94th	Elected to finish Bush's term. Re-elected in 1960. Re-elected in 1962. Re-elected in 1964. Re-elected in 1966. Re-elected in 1968. Re-elected in 1970. Re-elected in 1972. Re-elected in 1974. Retired.	[data missing]
Herman T. Schneebeli (Williamsport)	Republican	April 26, 1960 – January 3, 1977	86th 87th 88th 89th 90th 91st 92nd 93rd 94th	Elected to finish Bush's term. Re-elected in 1960. Re-elected in 1962. Re-elected in 1964. Re-elected in 1966. Re-elected in 1968. Re-elected in 1970. Re-elected in 1972. Re-elected in 1974. Retired.	[data missing]
Allen E. Ertel (Montoursville)	Democratic	January 3, 1977 – January 3, 1983	95th 96th 97th	Elected in 1976. Re-elected in 1978. Re-elected in 1980. Retired.	[data missing]
George Gekas (Harrisburg)	Republican	January 3, 1983 – January 3, 2003	98th 99th 100th 101st 102nd 103rd 104th 105th 106th 107th	Elected in 1982. Re-elected in 1984. Re-elected in 1986. Re-elected in 1988. Re-elected in 1990. Re-elected in 1992. Re-elected in 1994. Re-elected in 1996. Re-elected in 1998. Re-elected in 2000. Lost re-election.	[data missing]
George Gekas (Harrisburg)	Republican	January 3, 1983 – January 3, 2003	98th 99th 100th 101st 102nd 103rd 104th 105th 106th 107th	Elected in 1982. Re-elected in 1984. Re-elected in 1986. Re-elected in 1988. Re-elected in 1990. Re-elected in 1992. Re-elected in 1994. Re-elected in 1996. Re-elected in 1998. Re-elected in 2000. Lost re-election.	[data missing]
Tim Holden (St. Clair)	Democratic	January 3, 2003 – January 3, 2013	108th 109th 110th 111th 112th	Redistricted from the 6th district and re-elected in 2002. Re-elected in 2004. Re-elected in 2006. Re-elected in 2008. Re-elected in 2010. Lost renomination.	2003–2013 Berks, Dauphin, Lebanon, Perry, Schuylkill
Matt Cartwright (Moosic)	Democratic	January 3, 2013 – January 3, 2019	113th 114th 115th	Elected in 2012. Re-elected in 2014. Re-elected in 2016. Redistricted to the 8th district.	2013–2019
Conor Lamb (Mt. Lebanon)	Democratic	January 3, 2019 – January 3, 2023	116th 117th	Redistricted from the 18th district and re-elected in 2018. Re-elected in 2020. Retired to run for U.S. Senator.	2019–2023
Chris Deluzio (Aspinwall)	Democratic	January 3, 2023 – present	118th 119th	Elected in 2022. Re-elected in 2024. Re-elected in 2026.	2023–

== Recent election results ==
=== 2012 ===
Pennsylvania's 17th congressional district, 2012
Party	Candidate	Votes	%
Democratic	Matt Cartwright	161,393	60.3
Republican	Laureen Cummings	106,208	39.7
Total votes		267,601	100.0
Democratic hold			

=== 2014 ===
Pennsylvania's 17th congressional district, 2014
Party	Candidate	Votes	%
Democratic	Matt Cartwright (incumbent)	93,680	56.8
Republican	David Moylan	71,371	43.2
Total votes		165,051	100.0
Democratic hold			

=== 2016 ===
Pennsylvania's 17th congressional district, 2016
Party	Candidate	Votes	%
Democratic	Matt Cartwright (incumbent)	157,734	53.8
Republican	Matt Connolly	135,430	46.2
Total votes		293,164	100.0
Democratic hold			

=== 2018 ===
Pennsylvania's 17th congressional district, 2018
Party	Candidate	Votes	%
Democratic	Conor Lamb (incumbent)	183,162	56.3
Republican	Keith Rothfus (incumbent)	142,417	43.7
Total votes		325,579	100.0
Democratic gain from Republican			

=== 2020 ===
Pennsylvania's 17th congressional district, 2020
Party	Candidate	Votes	%
Democratic	Conor Lamb (incumbent)	222,253	51.1
Republican	Sean Parnell	212,284	48.9
Total votes		434,537	100.0
Democratic hold			

=== 2022 ===
Pennsylvania's 17th congressional district, 2022
Party	Candidate	Votes	%
Democratic	Chris Deluzio	193,615	53.4
Republican	Jeremy Shaffer	169,013	46.6
Total votes		362,628	100.0
Democratic hold			

=== 2024 ===
Pennsylvania's 17th congressional district, 2024
Party	Candidate	Votes	%
Democratic	Chris Deluzio (incumbent)	242,838	53.9
Republican	Rob Mercuri	207,900	46.1
Total votes		450,738	100.0
Democratic hold			

== See also ==
- List of United States congressional districts
- Pennsylvania's congressional districts
