= Vinegar Hollow =

Valley in Pennsylvania, United States

- Long-axis direction: West-East

Geography
- Location: Allegheny County, Pennsylvania
- Coordinates: 40.5129109°N 80.0859755°W
- Interactive map of Vinegar Hollow

Vinegar Hollow is a wooded valley in Kilbuck Township that abuts Ben Avon, Ben Avon Heights, and Emsworth districts, within Allegheny County, Pennsylvania.

== Origin of the name ==
The valley's name is of uncertain origin, but local historian, Darlene Phillips of Ohio Township, has reported several hearsay origins. One story is of a moonshine producer during the time of the region's Prohibition days, John Jacob Signor. Signor was known to local residents of Emsworth as "Vinegar Jake." "Vinegar Jake" purportedly made moonshine in the hollow, which he and others referred to as his "vinegar." Another attribution holds that, somewhere in the area of Lowries Run or Plummer Avenue, there was a small operation that created an industrial grade vinegar. This purported business would have been operated in the early 20th century, at a time that Pittsburgh buildings were routinely coated in soot from coal processing.

== Hodgdon Lodge ==
The valley was once home to Hodgdon Lodge, a rustic cabin built out of telephone poles, sometime in the early 20th century by Ben Avon Boy Scout Troop No. 172. The cabin was reported to be out of use by at least 1947.
