= Avonworth High School =

Location
- 304 Josephs Lane; Pittsburgh, Pennsylvania; United States
- Coordinates: 40.53194°N 80.07833°W

Information
- Funding type: Public
- Motto: "Large enough to matter, small enough to care."
- School district: Avonworth School District
- Principal: Keera Dwulit
- Staff: 50.20 (FTE)
- Grades: 9-12
- Enrollment: 583 (2023–2024)
- Student to teacher ratio: 11.61
- Colors: Red, White and Gray
- Mascot: Antelope
- Website: Avonworth High School

Avonworth High School is a high school serving the northern boroughs and townships of the metro region of Pittsburgh, Pennsylvania. Neighborhoods served include Ben Avon, Ben Avon Heights and Emsworth, along with Ohio Township and Kilbuck Township.
