= Northgate =

Northgate or North Gate may refer to:

== Historical structures ==
- Northgate, Chester, part of the city wall, in Cheshire, England
- St Michael at the North Gate, a church in Oxford, England
- Taipei North Gate

== Places ==
=== Australia ===
- Northgate, Queensland
- Northgate, South Australia

=== Canada ===
- Northgate, Saskatchewan

=== England ===
- Northgate Street, in Gloucester
- Northgate, Lincolnshire, see List of United Kingdom locations: Ni-North G#Northa - North G
- Northgate, Somerset, see List of United Kingdom locations: Ni-North G#Northa - North G
- Northgate, West Sussex
- Northgate (Wakefield), street in West Yorkshire

=== South Africa ===
- Northgate, Gauteng

=== United States ===
- Northgate, Oakland, California, Contra Costa County
- North Gate, California
- Northgate, Illinois, in Tuscola Township
- Northgate, North Dakota
- Northgate, Ohio
- Northgate, Salem, Oregon
- Northgate, Texas
- Northgate Peaks, in Zion National Park, Utah
- Northgate, Seattle, Washington

== Stations ==
- Northgate railway station, Brisbane, Queensland, Australia
- Northgate station (Sound Transit), Seattle, Washington, United States
- Chester Northgate railway station, Cheshire, England
- Newark North Gate railway station, Newark-on-Trent, Nottinghamshire, England
- Northgate Transit Centre, Edmonton, Alberta, Canada

== Schools ==
- Northgate High School (disambiguation)
- Northgate Junior – Senior High School, Bellevue, Pennsylvania, United States
- Northgate School District, Pittsburgh, Pennsylvania, United States

== Businesses ==
- Northgate (company), based in Darlington, England
- Northgate Computer Systems (now defunct), based in Minnesota, United States
- Northgate Cyberzone, a business district and financial enclave in Muntinlupa City, Philippines
- Northgate Information Solutions, based in Hemel Hempstead, England

== Malls and shopping centres ==
=== Australia ===
- Northgate Shopping Centre, Glenorchy, Tasmania

=== Canada ===
- Northgate Centre, Edmonton, Alberta

=== South Africa ===
- Northgate Shopping Centre, Johannesburg

=== United States ===
- Northgate Mall (Durham), North Carolina
- Northgate Mall (Hixson), Tennessee
- Northgate Mall (Ohio), Cincinnati
- Northgate Mall (San Rafael), California
- The District at Northgate, formerly Northgate Mall, Seattle, Washington

== People ==
- Dan Michel of Northgate, a 14th century English writer
