= Ben Avon (disambiguation) =

Ben Avon is a mountain in Scotland.

The name may also refer to:

- Ben Avon, Pennsylvania, United States, a borough
- Ben Avon Heights, Pennsylvania, United States, a borough
- Ben Avon, South Carolina, United States, a census-designated place
