= Ohio Township, Pennsylvania =

Township in the United States

Ohio Township
- Township
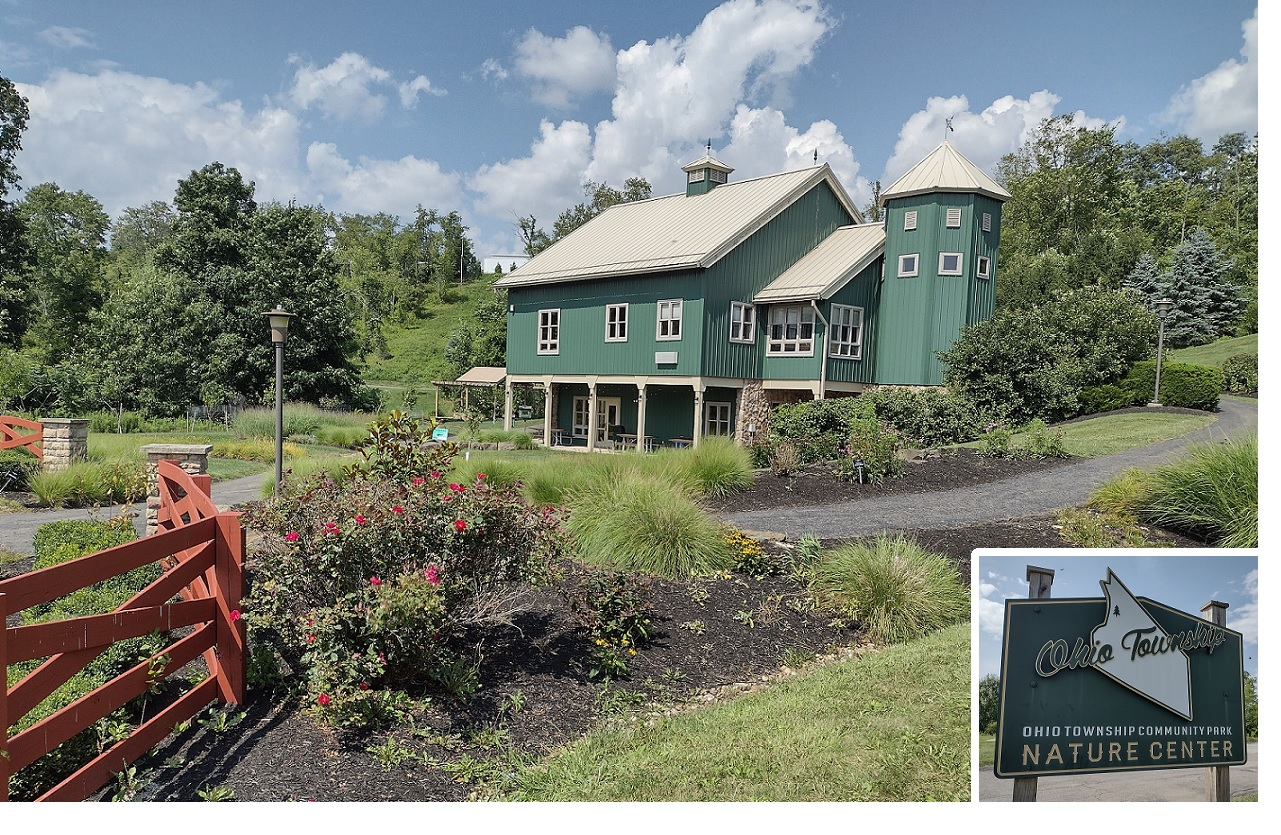
- Ohio Township Nature Center and Community Park

- Location in Allegheny County and the state of Pennsylvania

- Location of Pennsylvania in the United States
- Coordinates: 40°33′01″N 80°06′08″W
- Country: United States
- State: Pennsylvania
- County: Allegheny County
- Settled: 1799
- Formed: Sept. 1803

Area
  - Total: 6.86 sq mi (17.76 km^{2})
  - Land: 6.86 sq mi (17.76 km^{2})
  - Water: 0 sq mi (0.00 km^{2})

Population (2020)
  - Total: 7,178
  - Estimate (2022): 7,186
  - Density: 1,048/sq mi (404.5/km^{2})
- Time zone: UTC-5 (EST)
  - Summer (DST): UTC-4 (EDT)
- ZIP code: 15237 & 15143
- Area code: 412
- FIPS code: 42-003-56392
- Website: Ohio Township

Ohio Township is a township of the Second Class in Allegheny County, Pennsylvania, United States. Ohio Township elects a board of three Supervisors, a property tax collector, and a constable. The day-to-day business of the township is managed by a Township Manager serving at will. In addition to the Administration Office, the Police Department, Road Department, and Recreation Department are also under the direct administration of the Board of Supervisors. The Ohio Township Police Department provides full-time service, not only for Ohio Township, but through contractual agreements also for the Townships of Aleppo, Kilbuck, and Neville and the Boroughs of Ben Avon Heights, Emsworth and Sewickley Hills.

The population was 7,178 at the 2020 census. The township is located 9 miles (14 km) northwest of Pittsburgh. There is no central business district, but there are a few small shops in the Mt. Nebo area. A new shopping center has been built called Mt. Nebo Pointe. In recent years, several retail outlets have been built near the Camp Horne Road interchange of Interstate 279.

Ohio Township was named after the Ohio River.

== History ==
As reported in the History of Allegheny County, Pennsylvania, Ohio was the third township to be formed in Allegheny County north of the Ohio River, and it was the first subdivision of Pine township. Its creation was begun in December 1802, when a petition was filed in the court of quarter sessions. Gen. John Neville signed this petition. After considerable discussion as to where the boundary line would be created, at the September term of 1803, the court confirmed absolutely a division line which is currently the western boundaries of the current jurisdictions of Pine, McCandless, and Ross townships and Bellevue Borough, including that area of Allegheny County located west of this boundary line and north of the Ohio River as well as including Neville Island.

No event of remarkable interest signaled its early settlement. Being situated on the "Indian side" of the Ohio River, the first Caucasian inhabitants did not appear more than a few years prior to 1800, as this section of the country was not open to settlement until 1792. The first permanent settler to Ohio township was reported as William Richey in 1801. He had been a soldier in Wayne's expedition. While the army was lying at Legionville (near present-day Baden), he was sent on some commission to Fort Pitt. The Duff family was first represented by James Duff and his two sons, who crossed the Ohio River in 1799 and located near the river, relocating further inland in 1805. James Moore immigrated from Northumberland County with a large family about the same time. In addition to these, the Crawfords, who settled on Lowrie's Run, have been numerously represented by their descendants, the Gillilands, the Ritchies, Shannons, and others.

Ohio township was later reduced in size by the creation of other townships within its borders: among some of them, Franklin in 1823, Sewickley in 1854, and Kilbuck in 1869. The population in 1860 was 1,350, in 1870 was 685 (after loss of Kilbuck township area), and in 1880 was 737. Mount Nebo United Presbyterian Church was organized June 17, 1838. The land for the church was donated by two local farmers, Hugh Thompson and William Duff.

== Geography ==
According to the United States Census Bureau, the township has a total area of 6.9 square miles (18 km^{2}), all land.

=== Surrounding neighborhoods ===
Ohio Township has four borders, including Franklin Park to the north, Ross Township to the east, Kilbuck Township to the south, and Sewickley Hills to the west.

== Government and politics ==
Presidential election results
Year	Republican	Democratic	Third parties
2024	45% 2,190	54% 2,606	1% 63
2020	47% 2,148	51% 2,361	1% 55
2016	54% 1,804	46% 1,534	1% 25
2012	60% 1,764	39% 1,145	1% 20

Ohio Township is a Township of the Second Class. It elects a board of three Supervisors, a property tax collector, and a constable, each for a term of six years, with exception of the tax collector, whose term of office is four years. Ohio Township is divided into 3 voting districts. The day-to-day business of the township is managed by a Township Manager serving at will and is supported by an administrative staff. In addition to the Administration Office, the Police Department, Road Department, and Recreation Department are also under the direct administration of the Board of Supervisors.

=== Board of Supervisors ===
- [2023-2025] Multiparty-2 (Huffmyer, Hines), Republican-1 (Ceniceros), Democrats-0

== Education ==
Ohio Township is served by the Avonworth School District, which also serves the Boroughs of Ben Avon, Ben Avon Heights and Emsworth as well as Kilbuck Township. Avonworth School District includes Avonworth High School (9th–12th), Avonworth Middle School (6th–8th), Avonworth Elementary School (3rd–5th), and Avonworth Primary Center (K–2nd).

== Demographics ==
Historical population
Census	Pop.	Note	%±
1970	2,096		—
1980	2,072		−1.1%
1990	2,459		18.7%
2000	3,085		25.5%
2010	4,757		54.2%
2020	7,178		50.9%
2022 (est.)	7,186		0.1%
U.S. Decennial Census

As of the 2020 census, there were 7,178 people and 2,487 households residing in the township. The population density was 1,047.6 inhabitants per square mile (404.5/km^{2}). There were 2,664 housing units at an average density of 388.3 per square mile (149.9/km^{2}). The racial makeup of the township was 92.8% White, 1.8% African American, 0.0% Native American, 2.8% Asian, 0.0% Pacific Islander, and 2.5% from two or more races. Hispanic or Latino of any race were 2.4% of the population.

Of the 7,178 residents, 26.2% were children under the age of 18, 17.7% were persons 65 years of age or older, and 48.3% were female. The average household size was 2.68 and the owner-occupied housing unit rate was 82.0%.

In the township the population was spread out, with 27.5% under the age of 20, 7.0% from 20 to 29, 21.9% from 30 to 44, 25.9% from 45 to 64, and 17.7% who were 65 years of age or older. The median age was 41.3 years. For every 100 females there were 107.1 males.

As of the 2020 census covering data from 2017 to 2021, the median income for a household in the township was $128,369 while the per capita income was $56,226. About 4.6% of the population was below the poverty line. The U.S. Census estimates that the 2010 median income for a household in the township was $81,875. According to the 2011–2015 U.S. Census Bureau's American Community Survey, the median household income in the Township was $102,212 and the median family income was $120,841.
