= Davis Island Lock and Dam Site =

- U.S. National Register of Historic Places
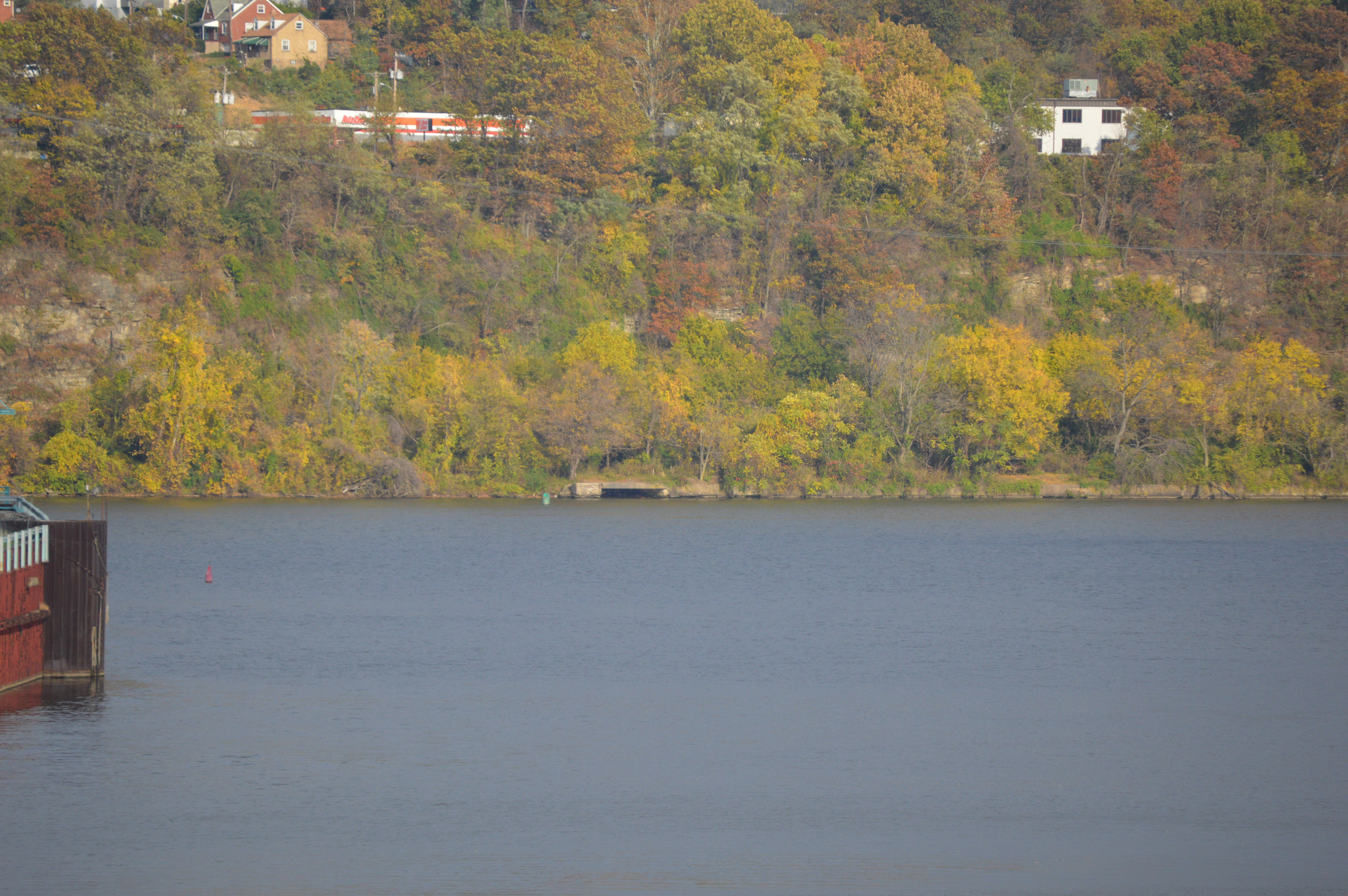

- Location within Pennsylvania Location within the United States
- Location: Off Pennsylvania Route 65, Avalon, Pennsylvania
- Coordinates: 40°29′35″N 80°3′56″W
- Built: 1885
- Architect: Army Corps of Engineers
- NRHP reference No.: 80003400
- Added to NRHP: August 29, 1980

The Davis Island Lock and Dam Site on the Ohio River in Avalon, Pennsylvania, is the site of the former Davis Island lock that was completed in 1885.

The lock and dam existed from 1878 to 1922, designed by William Emery Merrill and the U.S. Army Corps of Engineers. The Davis Island Lock and Dam was the first dam that was constructed on the Ohio River. It officially opened on October 7, 1885, with a large dedication ceremony. The Davis Island Dam was the largest Chanoine dam built in the 19th century, and one of the first concrete structures built by the Army Corps of Engineers. It was the first of 51 Chanoine type dams that were built by the Corps of Engineers between 1878 and 1929.

The dam was dismantled in 1922, when it was replaced by the Emsworth Locks and Dam less than a mile downstream of the original site. It was listed on the National Register of Historic Places on August 29, 1980 and designated as a National Historic Civil Engineering Landmark by the American Society of Civil Engineers in 1985.

It is now owned by the West View Water Authority and is used primarily to pump water from the Ohio River, which then goes on to be purified and is used by the surrounding communities for drinking.

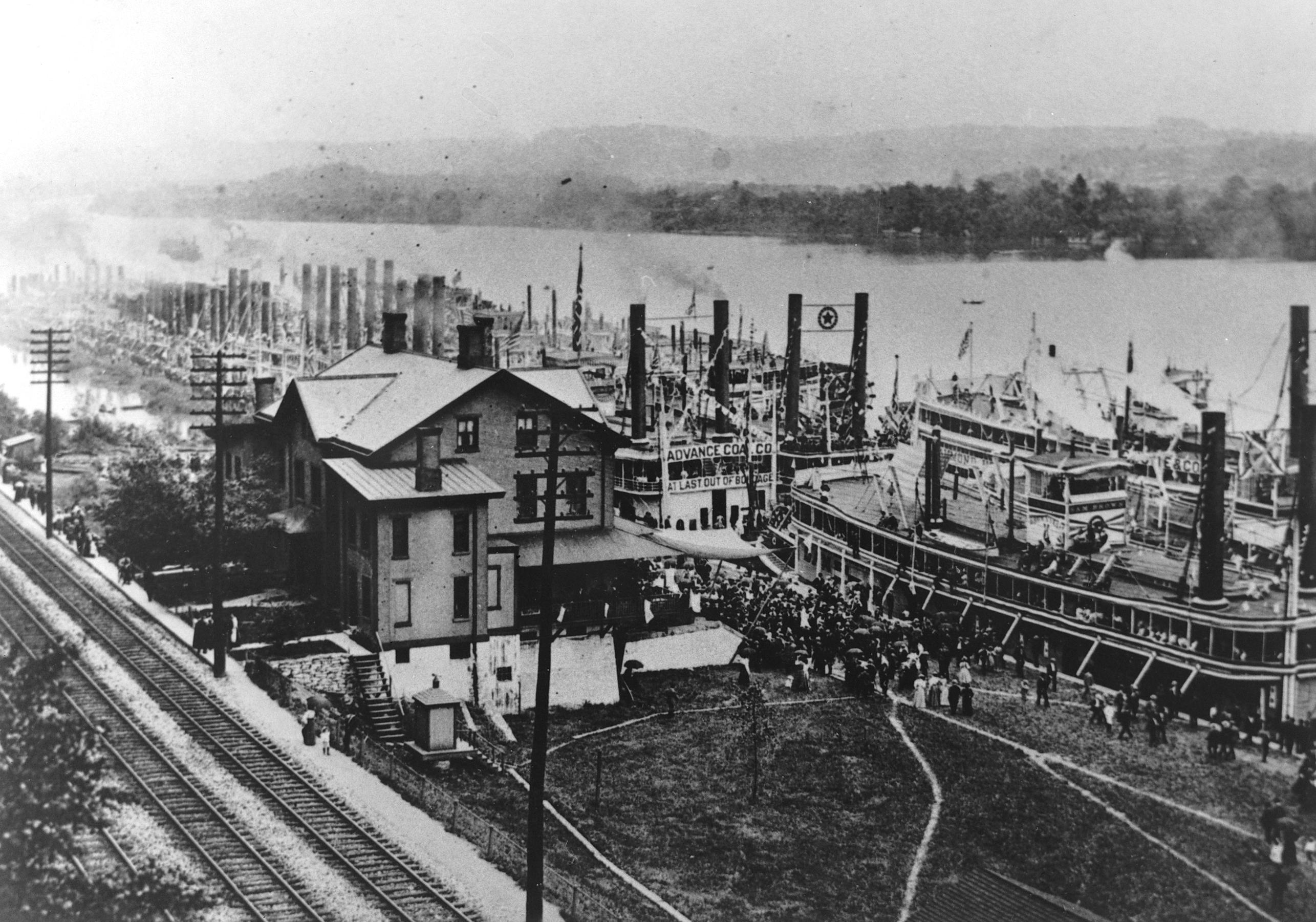
A river pageant celebrating the opening of the lock, 1885
