= Chet Fuhrman =

American football coach and administrator

Personal information
- Born: 1951 (age 74–75); Harrisburg, Pennsylvania, U.S.

Career information
- High school: John Harris (PA)
- College: Central Oklahoma

Career history

Coaching
- Penn State (1979–1981) Assistant strength and conditioning coach; Weber State (1981) Strength and conditioning coach; Penn State (1982–1992) Strength and conditioning coach; Pittsburgh Steelers (1992–2007) Conditioning coordinator; Virginia Destroyers (2011–2012) Strength coach & tight ends coach

Operations
- Avonworth School District (2009–2010) Athletic director

Awards and highlights
- Super Bowl champion (XL); UFL champion (2011); NFL Strength Coach of the Year Award (2005); Super Bowl Achievement Award (2005)

Earl Chester Fuhrman (born 1951) is a strength and conditioning coach who has worked at the professional level with the National Football League (NFL)'s Pittsburgh Steelers. He was the strength and tight ends coach for the Virginia Destroyers of the United Football League (UFL). He has also worked at the collegiate level and high school levels.

== Early life ==
Fuhrman was born in Harrisburg, Pennsylvania, where he attended John Harris High School (renamed Harrisburg High School in 1971). In high school, he participated in football and track and developed an interest in weight training. He matriculated at the University of Central Oklahoma where he earned a degree in physical education in 1973.

== Coaching career ==
Fuhrman began his career as a strength coach and assistant American football coach at his alma mater Harrisburg High School and then at Steelton-Highspire High School in his native Pennsylvania.

In 1979, he took a position as the assistant strength and conditioning coach at Pennsylvania State University (Penn State). Two years later, Fuhrman left Penn State to become the first head strength and conditioning coach at Weber State University in Ogden, Utah. He returned to Penn State the following year when the head strength and conditioning coach position opened up there. He spent the next eleven years at Penn State where he coached such athletes as Steve Wisniewski, Blair Thomas, Mike Munchak and Andre Collins

When Bill Cowher replaced Chuck Noll as head coach of the Pittsburgh Steelers he brought in Fuhrman to replace Jon Kolb as the team's conditioning coordinator. In 2005, Fuhman was voted by his peers in the league as the NFL Strength Coach of the Year. The Steelers won the Super Bowl in the same season

Fuhrman remained with the Steelers during Cowher's full tenure of fifteen seasons. He was not retained by new head coach Mike Tomlin in 2007.

In 2009 Fuhrman became the athletic director at Avonworth School District which is just northwest of Pittsburgh, Pennsylvania. He resigned from the position less than a year later.

In May 2011, Furhman was hired as assistant coach for the UFL's Virginia Destroyers (formerly the Florida Tuskers) under head coach and general manager Marty Schottenheimer. He was responsible for coaching the team's tight ends as well as performing as the strength coach but retired after a single year of coaching.

Furhman was a ninth grade football coaches at North Allegheny School District (Pittsburgh) in the 2015 season. He also is a substitute teacher at the North Allegheny schools.

== Personal life ==
Fuhrman and his wife, Lisa, have three children — Erica, Michael, and Maria. He also has one grandchild — Giovanni Steele.
