= North Hills High School =

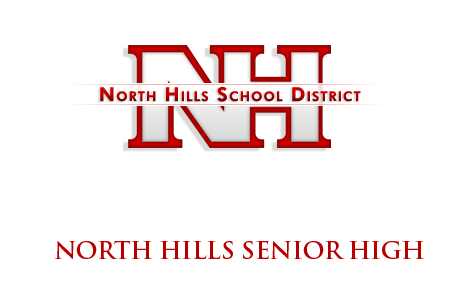

Location
- 53 Rochester Road; Pittsburgh, Pennsylvania 15229-1189; United States; 40.526081°N 80.025769°W

Information
- Type: Public
- Motto: Pride, Tradition, Excellence.
- School district: North Hills School District
- Grades: 9–12
- Color
- Mascot: Indian
- Rival: Shaler Area High School North Allegheny High school
- Website: https://hs.nhsd.net/

North Hills High School is a suburban high school located in Ross Township, a northern suburb of Pittsburgh. It serves students in grades 9–12 in the North Hills School District. North Hills High School's mascot is the Indian, with red and white as the school colors.

== Academic achievement ==
North Hills High School consistently scores in the top 20% of Pennsylvania Public High Schools with its PSSA scores.

- 2015-2016 121st out of 674
- 2014-2015 121st out of 674
- 2013-2014 200th out of 674
- 2012-2013 129th out of 674
- 2011-2012 131st out of 674
- 2010-2011 91st out of 674

== Notable alumni ==
- Dena Dietrich, stage and screen character actress, best known for playing Mother Nature in television commercials for Chiffon margarine (class of 1947)
- LaVar Arrington, former National Football League (NFL) linebacker for the Washington Redskins and New York Giants (class of 1997)
- Mark Kelso, former NFL safety for the Buffalo Bills (class of 1981)
- Chris Jamison, contestant and finalist of season 7 of The Voice (class of 2012)
- Andy Mientus, actor, known for playing Marius in the 2014 Broadway revival of Les Misérables and Hartley Rathaway/The Pied Piper on The Flash (class of 2005)
- Steve Brown, former professional track and field runner for the USA National Team and Reebok (class of 1985)

== Music programs ==
Both the Marching Band and Symphony Band are one of only a very few high school bands to participate in the inauguration ceremony of President George W. Bush. Warren S. Mercer Jr., North Hills High Band Director for 31 years until 1992, elevated the North Hills High School Symphony Band to national prominence. The band continued through director David Matthews (1992 - 2011) and under current director Leonard Lavelle (2012–present)

The NHHS Symphony Band has a long tradition, beginning in the 1950s with James Caruso, Warren Mercer, David Matthews, and currently Len Lavelle. The Symphony Band has also maintained the longest-running series of commissioned works of any high school band in the United States, beginning in 1965 with Philip Catelinet's Fantasy Mother Hubbard. Other commissioned works for the Symphony Band have been written by Mr. Don Gillis, Mr. Edward Madden, Mr. Robert Jager, Mr. Jerry Bilik, Mr. Rex Mitchell, Mr. Vaclav Nelhybel, Dr. Paul Whear, Mr. Norman Dello Joio, and Dr. Joseph Willcox Jenkins. Guest conductors through the years have included, Dr. William Revelli, Dr. Richard Strange, Dr.James Neilson, Dr. James Dunlop (PSU), Mr. Vaclav Nelhybel and in March 1973, Arthur Fiedler, Director of the Boston Pops Orchestra. ( References: MENC Music Educators National Conference January 19–22, 1973, Boston North Hills Symphony Band Bio Sheet, and.)

The NHHS Symphony Band was awarded the first Sudler Flag of Honor by the John Philip Sousa Foundation in 1983. The NHHS Symphony Band has won the highest honors in its section at the Carnegie Awards Festival sponsored by Carnegie Mellon University. It has performed at the Pennsylvania Music Educators Association State Convention 1965, 1971, 1995, 1998, 2014, and 2016; the Mid-West National Band Clinic, Chicago, Illinois, 1966, 1970, 1983, and 1987; the Mid-East Instrumental Clinic, Pittsburgh, Pennsylvania, 1967; the Music Educators National Convention in 1973, 1997, 2015 and 2017.

In more recent years, the band played at the John F. Kennedy Center for the Performing Arts. Their Wind Ensemble was the second opening act following the Arlington MA Honors Orchestra, for the 2024 Harmonic Convergence Concert (with the Choirs of America) playing at Carnegie Hall in New York City. They played; "Hungarian March" from La Damnation de Faust, Op. 24, by Hector Berlioz, Down a County Lane, by Aaron Copland, Fallingwater at Twilight(world premiere), by James M. David, and "Christus, der uns Selig Macht" from Symphony No. 4, by David Maslanka.

== Popular culture ==
The movie Warrior (2011 film), starring Tom Hardy and Joel Edgerton, was filmed on location at North Hills High School.

== Athletics ==
The North Hills Indians football team is now involved in WPIAL Class AAAAA (5-A) football. The largest statewide classification is (6-A).

Team National Championships

Football: 1987 USA Today National Champions (prior to PA state playoff creation)

Team State Championships

Football: 1993 victory over Central Bucks West 15-14 (AAAA).

Football: 1982 WPIAL Championship AAAA

== Rivalries ==
North Hills has several rivalries with other local school districts. The most notable rivalry is with the North Allegheny Tigers. Two notable postseason rivalries in football are with the Upper St. Clair Panthers and the Penn-Trafford Warriors. Another minor rivalry that has died down is with the namesake Penn Hills Indians.

== Lip dub ==
In 2014, North Hills High School saw viral success with their lip dub of Avicii's song "Wake me up." Nick Ross, the director of the lip dub, was featured on Fox News for a live interview in 2014 and since then has been featured on local news stations such as KDKA-TV. As of April 2020 the video had nearly 500,000 views on YouTube.
