= Samuel Calvin =

American politician (1811–1890)

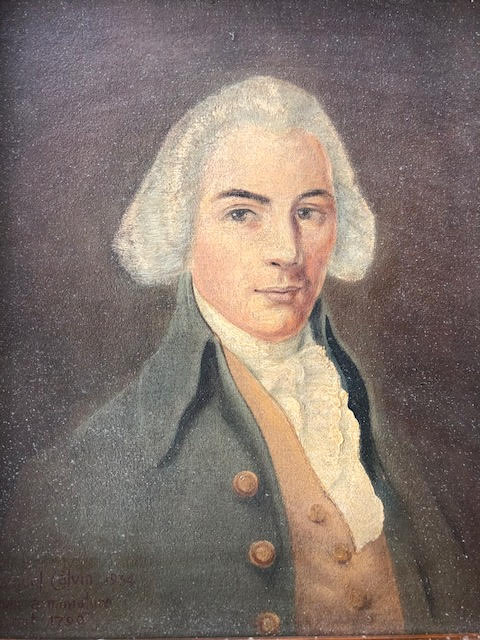
- Samuel Calvin as painted by his grandson, also Samuel Calvin

Member of the U.S. House of Representatives from Pennsylvania's 17th district
- In office March 4, 1849 – March 3, 1851
- Preceded by: John Blanchard
- Succeeded by: Andrew Parker

Personal details
- Born: July 30, 1811 Washingtonville, Pennsylvania
- Died: March 12, 1890 (aged 78)
- Party: Whig

Samuel Calvin (July 30, 1811 – March 12, 1890) was a Whig member of the U.S. House of Representatives from Pennsylvania.

== Biography ==
Samuel Calvin was born in Washingtonville, Pennsylvania. He attended the common schools and Milton Academy. He taught in Huntingdon Academy, studied law, was admitted to the bar in 1836 and commenced practice in Hollidaysburg, Pennsylvania.

Calvin was elected as a Whig to the Thirty-first Congress. He declined to be a candidate for renomination in 1850. He resumed the practice of law and served as director of the Hollidaysburg School Board for thirty years. Furthermore, he was a member of the State revenue board and a member of the State constitutional convention in 1873. He died in Hollidaysburg in 1890 and was buried in Zion Lutheran Cemetery (not in the Presbyterian Cemetery as previously thought, although a grandson of the same name is buried there). A Fall 1961 Bulletin of the Blair County Historical Society republished an article by Dr. Harry T. Coffey (written May 1, 1896) about the early days of the town and the leading men of Hollidaysburg:

"Among the young lawyers and businessmen who afterwards became prominent in public affairs were such men as David R. Porter, afterwards governor; James M. Bell, A. Porter Wilson and Samuel Calvin, (then a schoolteacher in Huntingdon).

"...I remember distinctly seeing as they came out in weekly parts, in green paper covers the first issues of Dicken's (then called "Boz") "Pickwick Papers." Lying on the counter and hearing Samuel Calvin reading aloud to some friends who might be with him, the doings of the immortal Pickwick... No man was ever born better fitted to interpret Dickens, (Himself scarcely excepted) than Samuel Calvin. Himself, for many years an accomplished principal, well versed in rhetoric and elocution and an orator of no little ability, a man whose able speeches on the subject of the tariff made him prominent as the whig (sic) candidate for governor in after years; a man who had much of the gentleness, amiability and good nature, without any of the weakness of Pickwick".

"Mr. Calvin, who must have removed from Huntingdon very soon after my father, was a frequent visitor at our house. He had a wide knowledge of classical literature, was a fine conversationalist, and I am indebted to him for some of the finest quotations from them, I can now recall, and also in developing my taste in the matter of reading only the best authors, especially English, whom he seems to have at his fingerends."

Samuel Calvin married Rebecca Blodget in the early 1840s and produced a daughter, Eliza in 1845, and a son, Mathew, in 1847. Mathew followed his father's example and became a lawyer.

Descendants of Samuel Calvin live in several states; Virginia, Maryland, Florida, and Pennsylvania.

== Sources ==
- United States Congress. "Samuel Calvin (id: C000060)". Biographical Directory of the United States Congress.
- The Political Graveyard

U.S. House of Representatives
Preceded by John Blanchard	Member of the U.S. House of Representatives from Pennsylvania's 17th congressional district 1849–1851	Succeeded by Andrew Parker
