= Jerry Interval =

American photographer (1923–2006)

- Born: October 10, 1923; Pittsburgh, Pennsylvania, United States
- Died: December 6, 2006 (aged 83); Moon Township, Pennsylvania
- Known for: Photography

Jerry Interval (October 10, 1923 – December 4, 2006) was an American portrait photographer and educator.

== The early years ==
Jerry Interval was born in Pittsburgh, Pennsylvania and grew up in the Brookline neighborhood of the city. When he was 17, he moved to Dunkirk, New York to attend Holy Cross Seminary, an all-male Roman Catholic boarding school that closed in 1968. While there, he studied to be a Passionist priest for a short time and graduated with a degree in psychology before returning to Pittsburgh.

In 1948, at the age of 25, he married Dora. The Intervals lived in McKees Rocks, Pennsylvania and Bellevue, Pennsylvania, before moving to the suburb of Franklin Park, Pennsylvania, where they lived for almost 43 years. They had seven children.

== Photography career ==
Interval was heavily Influenced by Yousuf Karsh, Alfred Stieglitz, Edward Steichen etc. in his teenage years and pursued photography as a hobby for several years before turning professional in 1968. In 1972, he earned the degree of master of photography from the Professional Photographers of America (PPA).

His work is documented in The Psychological Approach to Photographic Design, his associate thesis for the ASP, and in a self-published booklet described what he called crash-point symmetry, a compositional technique still widely used by professional photographers. Several examples of Interval's work—including some of his noted Merry Monks portraits—are housed at the Photo Antiquities Museum of Photographic History in Pittsburgh.

His work has appeared in Newsweek, Sports Illustrated, Reader's Digest etc.

A member of the Professional Photographers of America and Photographic Society of America (PSA), Interval lectured at photography conferences and was an instructor for the Winona International School of Professional Photography for about 20 years.

== Death ==
He died on December 4, 2006, in Moon Township, Pennsylvania, at the age of 83.
