= Andrew Parker (politician) =

American politician

Member of the U.S. House of Representatives from Pennsylvania's 17th district
- In office March 4, 1851 – March 3, 1853

Personal details
- Born: Andrew Parker; May 21, 1805 Cumberland County, Pennsylvania, U.S.
- Died: January 15, 1864 (aged 58) Mifflintown, Pennsylvania, U.S.
- Resting place: Westminster Presbyterian Cemetery, Mifflintown, Pennsylvania, U.S.
- Party: Democratic
- Education: Dickinson College
- Profession: Politician, lawyer

Andrew Parker (May 21, 1805 – January 15, 1864) was a 19th-century American lawyer and politician who was a one-term Democratic member of the U.S. House of Representatives from Pennsylvania from 1851 to 1853.

== Formative years ==
Andrew Parker was born in Cumberland County, Pennsylvania on May 21, 1805. He attended public schools and graduated from Dickinson College in Carlisle, Pennsylvania, in 1824.

== Career ==
Parker studied law in Carlisle, was admitted to the bar in 1826 and commenced practice in Lewistown, Pennsylvania.

He was subsequently appointed deputy attorney general of Mifflin County, Pennsylvania. He later moved to Mifflintown, Pennsylvania, in 1831, where he practiced law.

Parker was elected as a Democrat to the Thirty-second Congress. He continued the practice of law in Mifflintown until his death.

== Death and interment ==
Parker died in Mifflintown on January 15, 1864. He was buried in that community's Westminster Presbyterian Cemetery.

== Sources ==
- United States Congress. "Andrew Parker (id: P000055)". Biographical Directory of the United States Congress.
- Andrew Parker entry at The Political Graveyard

U.S. House of Representatives
Preceded by Samuel Calvin	Member of the U.S. House of Representatives from Pennsylvania's 17th congressional district 1851–1853	Succeeded by Samuel Lyon Russell
