= North Hills School District =

School district in Pennsylvania

Location
- Pittsburgh, Pennsylvania United States

District information
- Type: Public
- Motto: Pride, Tradition, Excellence.
- Budget: $84.46 million (2020-2021 Budget)

Students and staff
- Enrollment: 4,508 (2018-19)
- Athletic conference: WPIAL/PIAA
- Colors: Red & White

Other information
- Website: http://www.nhsd.net

The North Hills School District is a public school district in the northern suburbs of Pittsburgh, Pennsylvania. It serves an area of 14.6 square miles, including Ross Township, and West View. As of the 2018–2019 school year, North Hills School District enrolled 4,508 students.

== Schools and facilities ==
The district has six schools: 4 elementary schools (Grades K-5), (K-6 Until 2020); a middle school (Grades 6-8); and a high school (Grades 9-12):

- Highcliff Elementary School
- McIntyre Elementary School
- Ross Elementary School
- West View Elementary School
- North Hills Middle School (grades 6–8)
- North Hills High School (grades 9–12)

== Libraries ==
The North Hills School District program emphasizes information literacy and collaboration between teachers and librarians. Each library is staffed with a librarian; and each library actively participates in the AccessPa Power Library Program, which allows students and staff to access quality resources 24 hours a day from home or school. Librarians also provide staff and faculty with in-service training on new information technologies and literacy skills.

== Extracurriculars ==
The district offers a variety of clubs, activities and sports.

=== Arts ===
The drama club has produced both fall plays and spring musicals annually since 1989, and has one of the oldest theater programs of any Allegheny County public school. The district's annual "Arts Alive" program is a community-based activity in May, when student art is displayed and various musical groups perform.

=== Athletics ===
Students may choose from among 20 sports at the senior high and 21 at the junior high. North Hills has a football program. The North Hills Indians' successes include:

- 13 Conference Championships: 1980, 1981, 1985, 1986, 1987, 1988, 1992, 1993, 1996, 1999, 2002, 2005, 2008, 2010
- 4 WPIAL Championships: 1982, 1985, 1987, 1993
- 2 PIAA State Championship: 1993
- 1 USA Today National High School Football championship: 1987

North Hills has an intense rivalry with North Allegheny. Their annual football game is scheduled last for each team, and despite season records, it the biggest game of each team's seasons. In 2009, North Hills lost in the regular season matchup, but NH traveled to NA to win in the WPIAL play-offs. In 2016, the WPIAL's new 6 classification system placed North Hills in Class 5A and North Allegheny in Class 6A, meaning that the teams will no longer meet in regular season play, the first time that has happened in over half a century. However, the two schools will continue their rivalries in all other sports, including basketball, softball, and baseball.
