= William Emery Merrill =

William E. Merrill
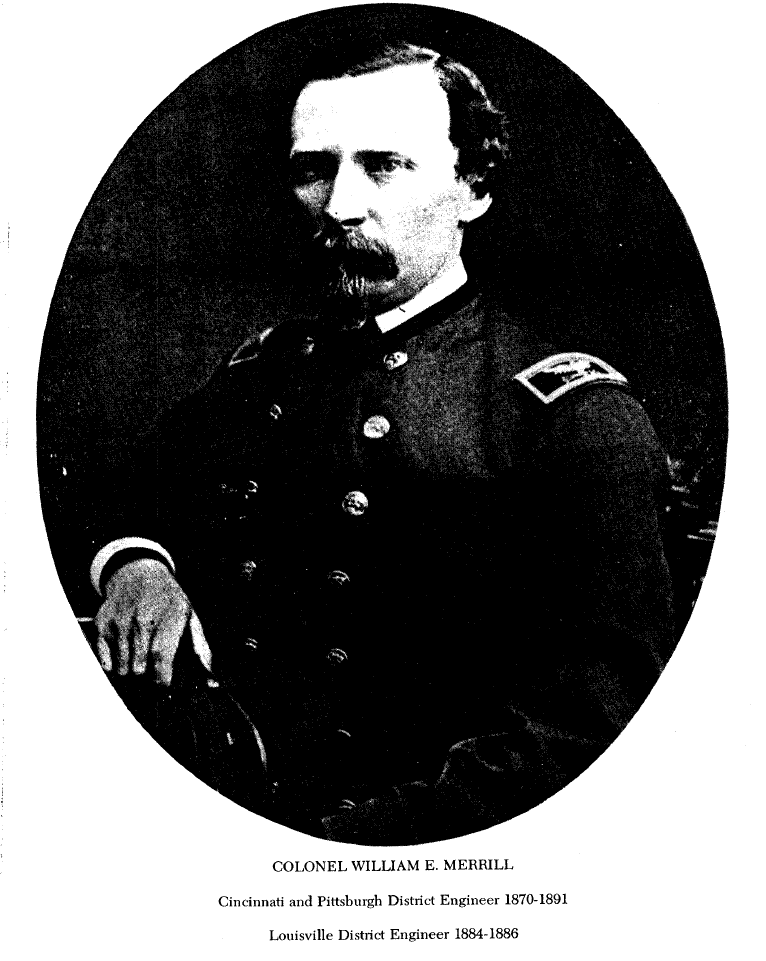
- Born: October 11, 1837; Fort Howard, Wisconsin, United States
- Died: December 14, 1891 (aged 54) Enfield, Illinois, United States
- Allegiance: United States
- Branch: United States Army
- Service years: 1859–1891
- Rank: Lieutenant Colonel
- Commands: 1st U. S. Veteran Engineer Regiment
- Conflicts: American Civil War; Peninsula campaign; Northern Virginia campaign
- Alma mater: United States Military Academy

William Emery Merrill (11 October 1837 – 14 December 1891) was an American soldier and military engineer. He was born at Fort Howard, Wisconsin to Captain Moses Merrill, who was killed in the Battle of Molino del Rey. He graduated first in his class at West Point in 1859, and from September, 1860, to July, 1861, was assistant professor of engineering there.

In the Civil War, he served as assistant engineer in the Army of the Potomac during the Peninsular campaign and in the northern Virginia campaign, and from July, 1864, to September, 1865, commanded as colonel, the 1st U.S. Veteran Volunteer Engineer Regiment. During the war he received the successive brevets of captain, major, lieutenant colonel, and colonel for gallant services.

In March, 1867, he was raised to the regular rank of major and in February, 1883, to that of lieutenant colonel. From 1867 to 1870, he was chief engineer on the staff of General Sherman, then commanding the Military Division of the Missouri, and thereafter until his death he was engaged on engineering work for the government. One of the most notable engineering works of its kind in America was the Chanoine wicket movable dam constructed by him at Davis's Island, 5½ miles below Pittsburgh. In 1889, he represented the United States Engineering Corps at the International Congress of Engineers in Paris.

He published Iron Truss Bridges for Railroads (1870) and Improvement of Non-Tidal Rivers (1881).

He died of heart failure near Enfield, Illinois on a train while en route to a government project in Shawneetown, Illinois.
