= West View, Pennsylvania =

Borough in Pennsylvania, US

- Borough
- Borough of West View
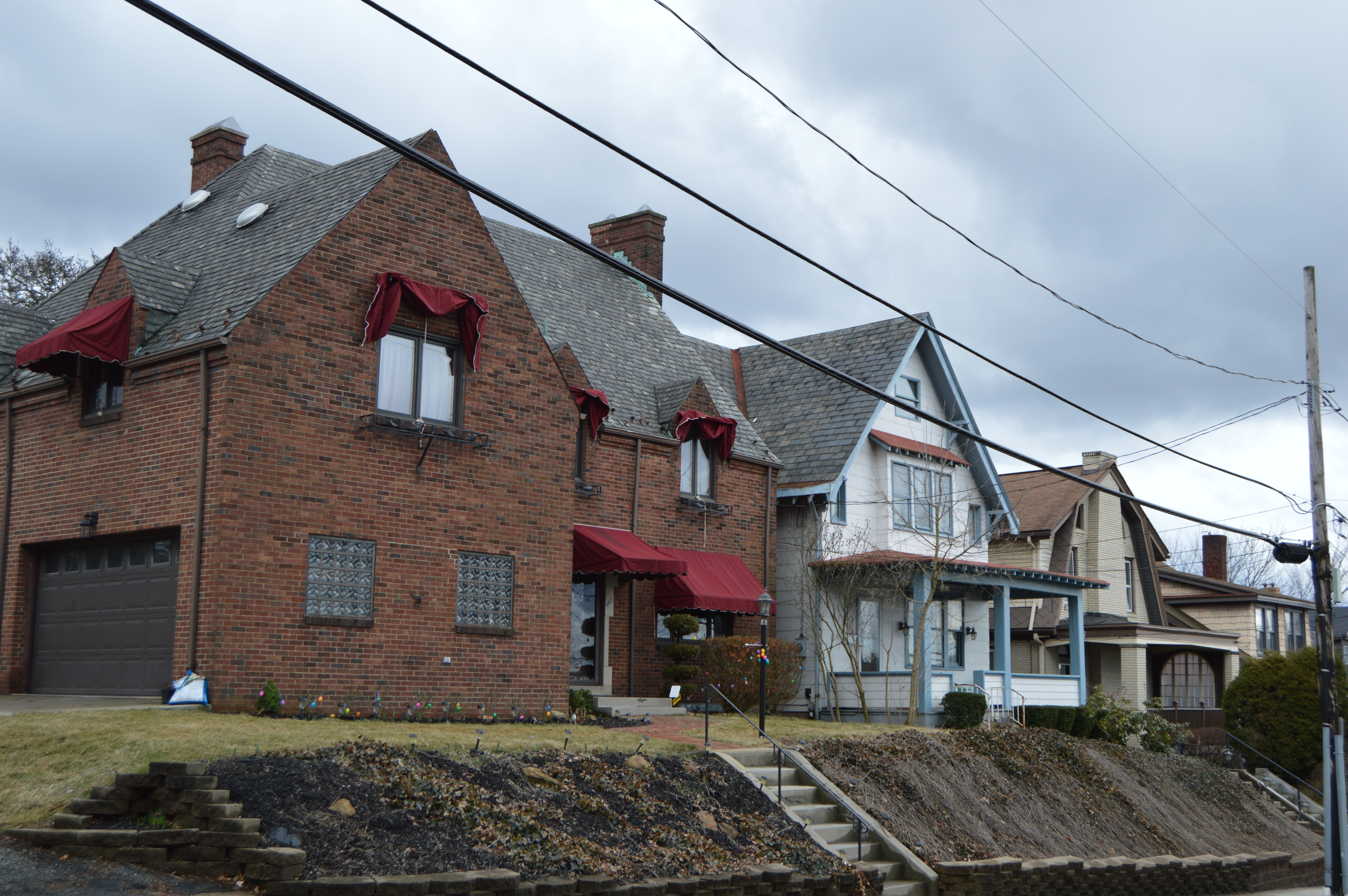
- Houses on Ridgewood Avenue
- Motto: A Good Place to Live
- Location in Allegheny County and the U.S. state of Pennsylvania.
- Coordinates: 40°31′6″N 80°2′1″W
- Country: United States
- State: Pennsylvania
- County: Allegheny
- Established: March 20, 1905
- Founder: Frederick Christian Martsolf

Area
  - Total: 1.01 sq mi (2.62 km^{2})
  - Land: 1.01 sq mi (2.62 km^{2})
  - Water: 0 sq mi (0.00 km^{2})

Population (2020)
  - Total: 6,685
  - Density: 6,453.4/sq mi (2,491.67/km^{2})
- Time zone: UTC-5 (EST)
  - Summer (DST): UTC-4 (EDT)
- ZIP code: 15229
- Area code: 412
- School district: North Hills
- FIPS code: 42-84144
- Website: www.wvboro.com

West View is a borough in Allegheny County, Pennsylvania, United States, just north of downtown Pittsburgh. The population was 6,685 at the 2020 census. It is a suburb of the Pittsburgh metropolitan area.

== Geography ==
West View is located at 40°31′6″N 80°2′1″W (40.518368, −80.033645).

According to the United States Census Bureau, the borough has a total area of 1.0 square mile (2.6 km^{2}), all land.

=== Climate ===
Climate data for West View, Pennsylvania
Month	Jan	Feb	Mar	Apr	May	Jun	Jul	Aug	Sep	Oct	Nov	Dec	Year
Mean daily maximum °F (°C)	36 (2)	39 (4)	50 (10)	61 (16)	71 (22)	79 (26)	83 (28)	81 (27)	75 (24)	63 (17)	51 (11)	40 (4)	61.1 (16.2)
Mean daily minimum °F (°C)	17 (−8)	19 (−7)	27 (−3)	36 (2)	46 (8)	55 (13)	59 (15)	58 (14)	51 (11)	40 (4)	32 (0)	28 (−2)	38.9 (3.8)
Average precipitation inches (mm)	2.49 (63)	2.48 (63)	2.95 (75)	3.12 (79)	3.74 (95)	3.46 (88)	4.00 (102)	3.17 (81)	3.42 (87)	2.21 (56)	2.90 (74)	2.74 (70)	36.68 (932)
Source: http://www.idcide.com/weather/pa/west-view.htm

== History ==
West View was first incorporated on March 20, 1905. In the early 1900s, the Allegheny-Bellevue Land Company began acquiring land in Ross Township in order to build houses. Land developer Frederick Christian Martsolf was particularly enamored by the area, so working with the Allegheny-Bellevue Land Company, he was able to incorporate 640 acres of land right in the middle of Ross Township into West View Borough. West View held its first election on May 16, 1905, with Martsolf being elected the first president of the Borough Council on May 24, 1905.

It is said that the name "West View" came from pioneers who, traveling north out of Pittsburgh on the Venango Trail, appreciated the view to the west. The Venango Trail was a trail that Native Americans had used for centuries by the time European settlers arrived. The trail began in Pittsburgh and went north, eventually ending in Erie, PA. Present-day U.S. Route 19, which goes right through the heart of West View, closely follows the path of the original Venango Trail.

Casper Reel was the first European settler in the West View/Ross area. Reel was born in Frankfurt, Germany on May 11, 1742. He immigrated to America around 1761. After serving in the Continental Army during the Revolutionary War, Reel received 727 acres of land in what was then Pine Township. He constructed a cabin in West View in 1792, but was forced to leave shortly thereafter due to Native American attacks. He did not return until 1795, when he built a second cabin which still exists in the borough today. Reel became a successful farmer and also the first tax collector north of Pittsburgh. He died on October 20, 1824. The bulk of West View today is made up of land that was once owned by Reel.

== Demographics ==
Historical population
Census	Pop.	Note	%±
1910	1,626		—
1920	2,797		72.0%
1930	6,028		115.5%
1940	7,215		19.7%
1950	7,581		5.1%
1960	8,079		6.6%
1970	8,312		2.9%
1980	7,648		−8.0%
1990	7,734		1.1%
2000	7,277		−5.9%
2010	6,771		−7.0%
2020	6,685		−1.3%

As of the 2020 census, there were 6,685 people and 2,806 households, and residing in the borough. The population density was 6,618.8 inhabitants per square mile (2,555.5/km^{2}). The racial makeup of the borough was 90.6% White, 2.9% African American, 0.4% Asian, 4.0% Hispanic or Latino, and 5.1% from two or more races.

There were 2,806 households, with the persons per household being 2.37.

The median income for a household in the borough was $75,054. The per capita income for the borough was $38,565. About 6.6% of the population were below the poverty line.

== Government and politics ==
=== Council members ===
[2017-2019] Democrats-6 (Schellhaus, Kircher, Borio, Aguglia, Steele, Mikec), Unknown party-1 (Miller), Republicans-0

Presidential election results
Year	Republican	Democratic	Third parties
2020	44% 1,750	54% 2,146	1% 61
2016	49% 1,655	50% 1,709	1% 42
2012	48% 1,567	51% 1,674	1% 45

== Education ==
West View, along with neighboring (and surrounding) Ross Township, is served by the North Hills School District.

== West View Park ==
From 1906 to 1977, West View was home to one of the most remembered Pittsburgh amusement parks, West View Park. West View Park was conceived by Theodore Marshall Harton II. In 1905, Harton entered into a 10-year lease with the Allegheny-Bellevue Land Company for 18.42 acres in the recently established Borough of West View. Conveniently situated at the end of the Bellevue/West View trolley line, West View Park first opened on May 23, 1906.

This one-midway trolley park featured two beloved roller coasters: The Dips, with its unique banked turn-around curve, and the Racing Whippet, which featured two coasters on a strategically placed single track so that the train that started on the left of the loading platform came back on the right side and vice versa. Another popular park attraction was "Danceland", an entertainment hall that featured many performers from big band to rock and roll over the years, most notably The Rolling Stones in 1964. Danceland burned to the ground in 1973 and was not rebuilt.

West View Park closed for good at the end of the 1977 season. Its competing amusement park, Kennywood, was continuously expanding with bigger attractions, which West View was unable to do because of its location. Today, West View Park Shopping Center (originally signed with a roller coaster resembling the Dips, replaced in 2010 by a new sign with a carousel horse on top) occupies the amusement park site. The shopping center opened in 1981. There are no traces of the park left, but several nearby businesses feature old memorabilia (such as signs, photos, and tickets).

The coming-of-age novel Stick Man, about a boy growing up in a bohemian household, with an accompanying musical soundtrack, is set in West View. Several key scenes are set in West View Park. The novel was written by West View native Richard Rossi.

Preceded by Reserve Township	Bordering communities of Pittsburgh	Succeeded by Bellevue
