= Avonworth School District =

School district in Pennsylvania

Coordinates: 40.52267°N 80.08655°W

- Map of Allegheny County school districts

Address
- 258 Josephs Lane Pittsburgh, Pennsylvania, 15237; United States

District information
- Type: Public

Students and staff
- District mascot: Antelope
- Colors: Red and Grey

Other information
- Website: http://www.avonworth.k12.pa.us/

The Avonworth School District is a small, suburban, public school district located in Allegheny County, Pennsylvania. Avonworth School District encompasses approximately 11 square miles. The district serves the Boroughs of Ben Avon, Ben Avon Heights, and Emsworth and Kilbuck Township and Ohio Township. According to 2020 federal census data, it serves a resident population of 12,194 people. In 2009, the district residents' per capita income was $27,781 a year, while the median family income was $62,331. According to the 2020 U.S. Census Bureau's American Community Survey, 5-year estimates, the district's per capital income was $48,009 per year and the median family income was $93,561.

The district operates four schools: Avonworth High School (9th–12th), Avonworth Middle School (7th–8th), Avonworth Elementary School (3rd-6th), and Avonworth Primary Center (K-2nd).
