= Avalon, Pennsylvania =

Borough in Pennsylvania, US

- Borough
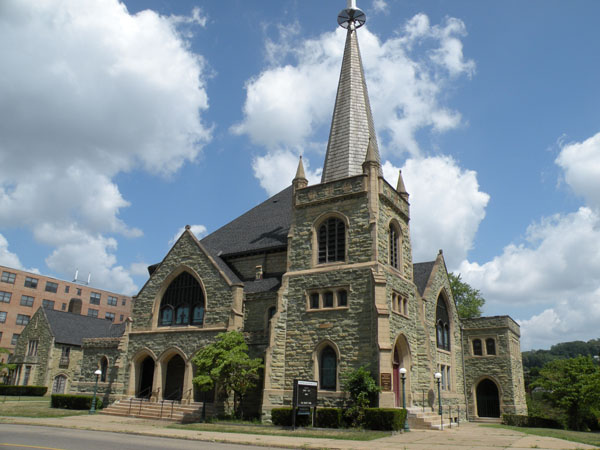
- Greenstone United Methodist Church located at 939 California Avenue
- Etymology: Mythical island in legend of King Arthur
- Location in Allegheny County and the U.S. state of Pennsylvania
- Coordinates: 40°30′4″N 80°4′7″W
- Country: United States
- State: Pennsylvania
- County: Allegheny
- Settled: c. 1800
- Incorporated: April 7, 1875

Government
  - Body: Avalon Borough Council
  - Mayor: Heather Weleski
  - Council President: Luke Meyer

Area
  - Total: 0.69 sq mi (1.79 km^{2})
  - Land: 0.62 sq mi (1.60 km^{2})
  - Water: 0.073 sq mi (0.19 km^{2})
- Elevation: 932 ft (284 m)

Population (2020)
  - Total: 4,762
  - Density: 7,722.0/sq mi (2,981.47/km^{2})
- Time zone: UTC-5 (EST)
  - Summer (DST): UTC-4 (EDT)
- ZIP code: 15202
- Area code: 412
- FIPS code: 42-03608
- School District: Northgate
- Website: http://www.boroughofavalon.org/

Avalon is a borough in Allegheny County, Pennsylvania, United States, along the Ohio River 6 miles (10 km) downstream from Pittsburgh. The population was 4,762 at the 2020 census. It is a residential suburb of the Pittsburgh metropolitan area.

== History ==
On December 9, 1874, a group of 29 property owners met and decided they wanted to separate from Kilbuck Township, which itself split from Pine Township in 1869. They petitioned the Court of Quarter Sessions of Pennsylvania for incorporation papers. The petition was drawn up by Noah Shafer, who eventually became West Bellevue's first solicitor. The group was notified that it first had to hold an election so officials of the petitioning body could make the request for incorporation. The first election was held December 26, 1874. James Semple was elected the first burgess, a position he held three different times. When the petition was submitted the second time, the court was in recess. The court met again in April, and on April 7, 1875, approved the petition and West Bellevue's right to incorporation. It was named after the legendary island of Avalon ("land of apples") on account of there being several orchards in the area. The streetcar reached Avalon around 1900, and in later years the borough was served by Pittsburgh Railways route 14 Avalon and then route 6/14 Brighton Avalon. The service ended on April 30, 1966, when many of the West End lines were abandoned by the Port Authority of Allegheny County, in preparation for bridge replacements over the Allegheny River.

== Geography ==
Avalon is located at 40°30′4″N 80°4′7″W.

According to the United States Census Bureau, the borough has a total area of 0.7 square miles (1.8 km^{2}), of which 0.6 square miles (1.6 km^{2}) is land and 0.1 square miles (0.26 km^{2}) is water. Its average elevation is 932 feet (284 m) above sea level.

=== Surrounding and adjacent communities ===
Avalon has four land borders, including Ben Avon Heights to the north, Kilbuck Township to the north, northeast and northwestern corner, Bellevue to the east, and Ben Avon to the west. Across the Ohio River to the south, Avalon runs adjacent with the eastern end of Neville Island (Neville Township) as well as the Davis Island Lock and Dam Site in which its location is designated as in Avalon.

== Demographics ==
Historical population
| Census | Pop. | Note | %± |
|---|---|---|---|
| 1880 | 326 | | — |
| 1890 | 804 | | 146.6% |
| 1900 | 2,130 | | 164.9% |
| 1910 | 4,317 | | 102.7% |
| 1920 | 5,277 | | 22.2% |
| 1930 | 5,940 | | 12.6% |
| 1940 | 6,155 | | 3.6% |
| 1950 | 6,463 | | 5.0% |
| 1960 | 6,859 | | 6.1% |
| 1970 | 7,010 | | 2.2% |
| 1980 | 6,240 | | −11.0% |
| 1990 | 5,784 | | −7.3% |
| 2000 | 5,294 | | −8.5% |
| 2010 | 4,705 | | −11.1% |
| 2020 | 4,762 | | 1.2% |

=== 2020 census ===
As of the 2020 census, Avalon had a population of 4,762. The median age was 41.8 years. 13.8% of residents were under the age of 18 and 21.6% of residents were 65 years of age or older. For every 100 females there were 88.0 males, and for every 100 females age 18 and over there were 85.7 males age 18 and over.

100.0% of residents lived in urban areas, while 0.0% lived in rural areas.

There were 2,544 households in Avalon, of which 16.0% had children under the age of 18 living in them. Of all households, 26.3% were married-couple households, 26.2% were households with a male householder and no spouse or partner present, and 38.8% were households with a female householder and no spouse or partner present. About 49.3% of all households were made up of individuals and 18.6% had someone living alone who was 65 years of age or older.

There were 2,748 housing units, of which 7.4% were vacant. The homeowner vacancy rate was 0.9% and the rental vacancy rate was 6.1%.

Racial composition as of the 2020 census
| Race | Number | Percent |
|---|---|---|
| White | 3,822 | 80.3% |
| Black or African American | 538 | 11.3% |
| American Indian and Alaska Native | 10 | 0.2% |
| Asian | 58 | 1.2% |
| Native Hawaiian and Other Pacific Islander | 2 | 0.0% |
| Some other race | 50 | 1.0% |
| Two or more races | 282 | 5.9% |
| Hispanic or Latino (of any race) | 136 | 2.9% |

=== 2000 census ===
As of the census of 2000, there were 5,294 people, 2,629 households, and 1,282 families residing in the borough. The population density was 8,409.1 inhabitants per square mile (3,246.8/km^{2}). There were 2,845 housing units at an average density of 4,519.1 per square mile (1,744.8/km^{2}). The racial makeup of the borough was 83% White, 5% African American, 0.09% Native American, 0.45% Asian, 0.02% Pacific Islander, 0.15% from other races, and 1.40% from two or more races. Hispanic or Latino of any race were 0.59% of the population.

There were 2,629 households, out of which 19.7% had children under the age of 18 living with them, 34.6% were married couples living together, 11.6% had a female householder with no husband present, and 51.2% were non-families. 45.4% of all households were made up of individuals, and 21.3% had someone living alone who was 65 years of age or older. The average household size was 1.99 and the average family size was 2.83.

In the borough the population was spread out, with 18.2% under the age of 18, 8.6% from 18 to 24, 29.6% from 25 to 44, 20.2% from 45 to 64, and 23.5% who were 65 years of age or older. The median age was 41 years. For every 100 females, there were 84.6 males. For every 100 females age 18 and over, there were 80.4 males.

The median income for a household in the borough was $29,236, and the median income for a family was $41,327. Males had a median income of $31,568 versus $24,149 for females. The per capita income for the borough was $18,594. About 8.4% of families and 11.3% of the population were below the poverty line, including 18.6% of those under age 18 and 10.3% of those age 65 or over.

== Government and politics ==
Presidential Elections Results
| Year | Republican | Democratic | Third Parties |
|---|---|---|---|
| 2024 | 32% 907 | 66% 1,830 | 2% 47 |
| 2020 | 34% 945 | 64% 1,761 | 1% 38 |
| 2016 | 36% 868 | 59% 1,425 | 5% 133 |
| 2012 | 40% 911 | 59% 1,352 | 1% 33 |

== Education ==
The borough is located in the Northgate School District.

== Notable people ==
- Robert J. Corbett, U.S. Representative from Pennsylvania
- Jim Haslett, NFL Football Player and Coach
- Mercury Morris, Super Bowl winning running back and kick returner.

== See also ==
- List of cities and towns along the Ohio River
