= Arthurs-Johnson House =

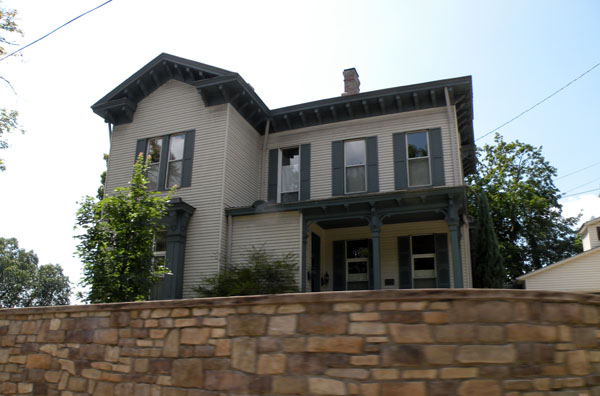

- Location of 6925 Ohio River Boulevard in Allegheny County, Pennsylvania
- 40°30′11.34″N 80°4′49.67″W
- Location: 6925 Ohio River Boulevard, Ben Avon, Allegheny County, Pennsylvania, USA

History
- Built: 1873

Pittsburgh Landmark – PHLF
- Designated: 1981

Arthurs-Johnson House located at 6925 Ohio River Boulevard in Ben Avon, Allegheny County, Pennsylvania, was built in 1873. The house was added to the List of Pittsburgh History and Landmarks Foundation Historic Landmarks in 1981.
