= John Blanchard (politician) =

American politician (1787–1849)

Member of the U.S. House of Representatives from Pennsylvania's 17th district
- In office March 4, 1845 – March 3, 1849
- Preceded by: James Irvin
- Succeeded by: Samuel Calvin

Personal details
- Born: September 30, 1787 Peacham, Vermont, U.S.
- Died: March 9, 1849 (aged 61)
- Party: Whig

John Blanchard (September 30, 1787 – March 9, 1849) was a Whig member of the U.S. House of Representatives from Pennsylvania.

John Blanchard was born in Peacham, Vermont. He taught school, and graduated from Dartmouth College in Hanover, New Hampshire, in 1812. He moved to Pennsylvania in 1812 and settled in York, Pennsylvania, where he again taught school. He studied law, was admitted to the bar March 31, 1815, and commenced practice in Lewistown, Pennsylvania. He moved to Bellefonte, Pennsylvania, the same year and continued the practice of law. He owned slaves.

Blanchard was elected as a Whig to the Twenty-ninth and Thirtieth Congresses. He was not a candidate for renomination in 1848. He died in Columbia, Pennsylvania, en route from Washington, D.C., to his home in 1849. Interment in Union Cemetery in Bellefonte.

His son Edmund Blanchard became a prominent businessman in Bellefonte.

== Sources ==
- United States Congress. "John Blanchard (id: B000539)". Biographical Directory of the United States Congress.
- The Political Graveyard

U.S. House of Representatives
| Preceded by James Irvin | Member of the U.S. House of Representatives from Pennsylvania's 17th congressional district 1845–1849 | Succeeded by Samuel Calvin |
