= Northgate High School =

Northgate High School may refer to:

== United Kingdom ==
- Northgate High School, Dereham, Norfolk
- Northgate High School, Ipswich, Suffolk

== United States ==
- Northgate High School (Newnan, Georgia)
- Northgate High School (Walnut Creek, California)
- Northgate Junior – Senior High School, Pittsburgh, Pennsylvania
