= Bellevue, Pennsylvania =

Borough in Pennsylvania, US

- Borough
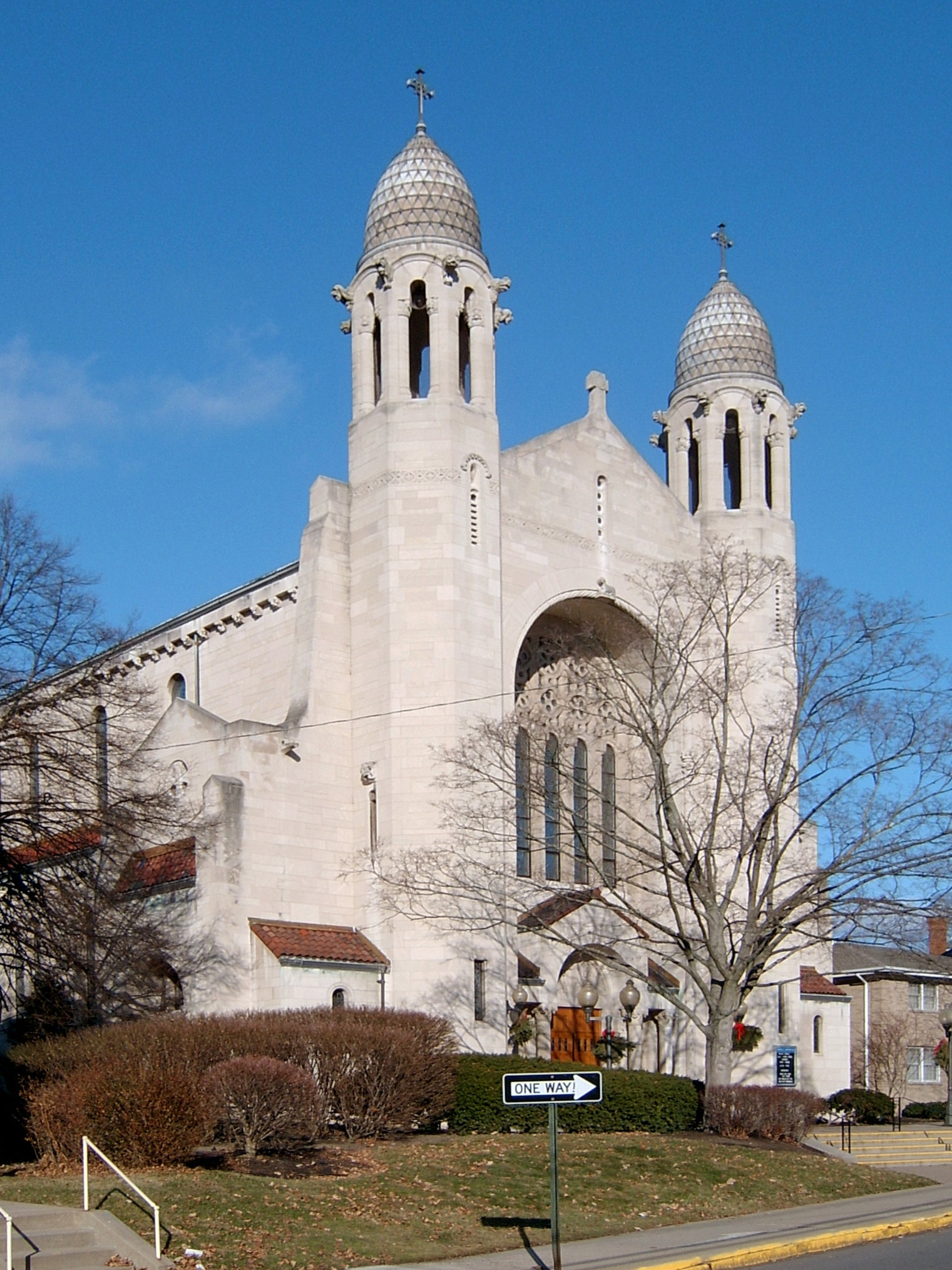
- Catholic Church of the Assumption

- Seal
- Etymology: belle vue, French for beautiful view
- Location in Allegheny County and the U.S. state of Pennsylvania.
- Coordinates: 40°29′38″N 80°3′13″W
- Country: United States
- State: Pennsylvania
- County: Allegheny
- Settled: 1796–1804
- Incorporated: September 7, 1867 (159 years ago)

Government
  - Mayor: Bri Erskine
  - Council President: Dan McKelvey

Area
  - Total: 1.12 sq mi (2.91 km^{2})
  - Land: 1.01 sq mi (2.62 km^{2})
  - Water: 0.11 sq mi (0.29 km^{2})
- Elevation: 997 ft (304 m)

Population (2020)
  - Total: 8,311
  - Density: 8,231.4/sq mi (3,178.18/km^{2})
- Time zone: UTC-5 (EST)
  - Summer (DST): UTC-4 (EDT)
- ZIP code: 15202
- Area code: 412
- FIPS code: 42-05312
- School District: Northgate
- Website: bellevuepa.org

Bellevue is a borough in Allegheny County, Pennsylvania, United States, along the Ohio River. The population was 8,311 at the 2020 census. A suburb of Pittsburgh, it is part of the Pittsburgh metropolitan area.

The borough was incorporated in 1867. There is a public park and library, the Andrew Bayne Memorial Library.

== History ==
The land on which the borough now sits was once part of the Depreciation Lands reserved for Revolutionary War veterans. The first landowners in the area were James Robinson and Hugh Henry Brackenridge, who purchased parcels in 1799 and 1792, respectively.

Early settlers in what would become Bellevue included Samuel Dilworth, Andrew Jack, Zachariah Blackburn, and Erasmus Cooper. Jack operated a ferry, hotel, and mill, and was prominent in the community’s early development. By the late 19th century, the borough was described as combining "healthfulness, accessibility, and beautiful natural scenery," and as offering suburban advantages for those working in nearby Pittsburgh. Methodist and Presbyterian congregations were established in the mid-19th century, with church buildings completed in the 1860s and 1870s.

Residents of the area sought road and infrastructure improvements from Ross Township, but township officials opposed development along the Venango Trail (today Route 19). In response, Bellevue incorporated as a borough independent of Ross on September 7, 1867. The name “Bellevue” was chosen by J. J. East, a linguist and early resident, and means “beautiful view.” At the time of its incorporation, Bellevue had exactly the minimum population then required for borough status: 300 residents.

The community's post office, originally established under the name Robella, was renamed "Bellevue" on April 16, 1887.

Bellevue was historically a dry town, prohibiting the sale of alcohol in stores and restaurants even before Prohibition. Alcohol sales remain regulated by the Pennsylvania Liquor Control Board (PLCB). A 2011 referendum to allow limited alcohol sales at certain establishments was defeated, but a similar measure passed in 2015.

=== Architecture ===
Bellevue contains over 1,000 buildings over 100 years old. In 2016, to recognize 150 years since the borough's founding, Bellevue's Community Development Corporation (CDC), Bona Fide Bellevue, launched a historic building plaque program, consisting of inventorying all the buildings in Bellevue. Of over 2,600 buildings, just over 730 had been approved locally "historic." Over 150 property owners voluntarily elected to purchase a plaque signifying the historic nature of their buildings.

Three buildings have been further recognized as historic:

- Andrew Bayne House - 34 North Balph Avenue - built 1875. Andrew Bayne Public Library. Recognized by Pittsburgh History Landmarks Foundation (PHLF).
- Andrew S. and Elizabeth Miller House - 366 Lincoln Avenue - built 1902. Currently a restaurant. Added to the National Register of Historic Places in 2019 and recognized by PHLF.
- Marius Rousseau House - 100 Watkins Avenue - built 1906. Private residence. Recognized by PHLF.

== Geography ==
Bellevue is located at 40°29′38″N 80°3′13″W.

According to the United States Census Bureau, the borough has a total area of 1.1 square miles (2.8 km^{2}), of which 1.0 square mile (2.6 km^{2}) is land and 0.1 square miles (0.26 km^{2}), or 9.09%, is water. Its average elevation is 997 feet (304 m) above sea level.

=== Surrounding and adjacent communities ===
Bellevue has three land borders with Avalon to the northwest, Ross Township to the north and east, and the Pittsburgh neighborhood of Brighton Heights to the southeast. Across the Ohio River to the southwest, Bellevue adjoins Stowe Township.

== Demographics ==
Historical population
Census	Pop.	Note	%±
1870	384		—
1880	915		138.3%
1890	1,418		55.0%
1900	3,416		140.9%
1910	6,323		85.1%
1920	8,198		29.7%
1930	10,252		25.1%
1940	10,488		2.3%
1950	11,604		10.6%
1960	11,412		−1.7%
1970	11,586		1.5%
1980	10,128		−12.6%
1990	9,126		−9.9%
2000	8,770		−3.9%
2010	8,370		−4.6%
2020	8,311		−0.7%

As of the census of 2000, there were 8,770 people, 4,389 households, and 1,953 families residing in the borough. The population density was 8,768.1 inhabitants per square mile (3,385.4/km^{2}). There were 4,770 housing units at an average density of 4,769.0 per square mile (1,841.3/km^{2}). The racial makeup of the borough was 88.4% White, 8.40% African American, 0.1% Native American, 0.65% Asian, 0.3% from other races, and 1.8% from two or more races. Hispanic or Latino of any race were 3 1.4% of the population.

There were 4,389 households, out of which 19.8% had children under the age of 18 living with them, 30.6% were married couples living together, 11.0% had a female householder with no husband present, and 55.5% were non-families. 48.1% of all households were made up of individuals, and 13.4% had someone living alone who was 65 years of age or older. The average household size was 1.97 and the average family size was 2.92.

In the borough the population was spread out, with 19.5% under the age of 18, 8.9% from 18 to 24, 35.0% from 25 to 44, 20.6% from 45 to 64, and 16.0% who were 65 years of age or older. The median age was 37 years. For every 100 females, there were 80.7 males. For every 100 females age 18 and over, there were 76.9 males.

The median income for a household in the borough was $31,481, and the median income for a family was $42,382. Males had a median income of $30,683 versus $26,596 for females. The per capita income for the borough was $19,246. About 7.8% of families and 18.3% of the population were below the poverty line, including 11.2% of those under age 18 and 9.7% of those age 65 or over.

== Government and politics ==
Bri Erskine , Mayor

Presidential Elections Results
Year	Republican	Democratic	Third Parties
2016	34% 1,331	60% 2,363	6% 225
2012	38% 1,397	60% 2,237	2% 64

== Education ==
Bellevue is served by the Northgate School District.

== Notable people ==
- Martha Atwell, radio director
- Thomas McKee Bayne, former member of the United States House of Representatives
- Matt Driscoll, head men's basketball coach for University of North Florida
- Ron Frenz, comic book artist for Marvel Comics
- Jerry Interval, portrait photographer
- Philip Childs Keenan, astronomer and co-developer of the MKK stellar spectral classification scheme
- Sam Parks, Jr., golfer, 1935 U.S. Open champion
- Tom Sherman, former NFL quarterback

== See also ==
- List of cities and towns along the Ohio River

Preceded by West View	Bordering communities of Pittsburgh	Succeeded by McKees Rocks
