= Northgate Junior – Senior High School =

Coordinates: 40.5061°N 80.0566°W

Northgate Junior - Senior High School

Location
- 589 Union Avenue; Pittsburgh, Pennsylvania 15202

Information
- Type: Public
- Principal: Nancy Bowman, Micheal Amick, Mike Wagstaff
- Enrollment: 463 (2017-18)
- Campus: Suburban
- Colors: Red and Gold
- Athletics conference: WPIAL
- Nickname: Flames
- Website: http://www.northgatesd.net

Northgate Junior – Senior High School is a public high school in Pittsburgh, Pennsylvania, United States, serving Northgate School District. It is located in Bellevue, a borough of Allegheny County. The school district is relatively small, consisting of only two elementary schools, one in Avalon, and one in Bellevue. The school combines grades 7-12 into one Junior-Senior High School.
