= Northgate School District =

School district in Pennsylvania

Address
- 591 Union Avenue Pittsburgh, Pennsylvania, 15202; United States

District information
- Type: Public

Other information
- Website: https://www.northgatesd.net/

Northgate School District is a diminutive, suburban, public school district located in Allegheny County, Pennsylvania. It serves the boroughs of Bellevue and Avalon, Pennsylvania. Northgate School District encompasses approximately 1 square mile (2.6 km^{2}). According to 2000 federal census data, it serves a resident population of 13,113. In 2009, the district residents' per capita income was $19,001, while the median family income was $41,896.

Northgate School District operates three schools: Bellevue Elementary, Avalon Elementary, and Northgate Junior - Senior High School. Bellevue Elementary and Avalon Elementary are K-6 while the Jr./Sr. High is 7-12.

== Extracurriculars ==
The district offers a variety of clubs, activities and sports.

=== Sports ===
The District funds:

Boys:

- Baseball - Varsity and Junior Varsity
- Basketball - Varsity, Junior Varsity, Middle School
- Cross Country
- Football - Varsity and Junior Varsity
- Golf
- Soccer
- Swimming and Diving
- Track and Field
- Wrestling - Varsity and MS

Girls:

- Cheerleading
- Basketball - Varsity and Junior Varsity
- Cross Country
- Softball - Varsity and Middle School
- Soccer
- Swimming and Diving - Varsity and Middle School
- Volleyball - Varsity and Middle School
- According to PIAA directory July 2012
