= Kilbuck Township, Allegheny County, Pennsylvania =

Township in Pennsylvania, US

Coordinates: 40°31′07″N 80°06′10″W

Location in Allegheny County and the state of Pennsylvania

Kilbuck Township is a township in Allegheny County, Pennsylvania, United States. The population was 774 at the 2020 census.

Kilbuck Township was named after Gelelemend, also known as Capt. John Killbuck, a signatory to the Treaty of Fort Pitt.

== History ==
The township was established in 1869 and officially named after the well known John Killbuck Jr., the prominent 18th-century Lenape (Delaware), alias Chief Gelelemund. Because both the Chief and the historical settlement spelling were tied directly to the name "Killbuck," the extra "l" was frequently used in the 19th and early 20th centuries. Forgetting the heritage of the name, the municipality started using the single-"l" version, Kilbuck Township, though the original spelling is still seen in contemporary and historical texts.

The Court of Quarter Sessions separated the Borough of Emsworth from old Killbuck Township on July 14, 1896, by amalgamating the villages of Clifton and Emsworth.

== Geography ==
According to the United States Census Bureau, the township has a total area of 2.6 square miles (6.7 km^{2}), of which 2.5 square miles (6.5 km^{2}) is land and 0.04 square miles (0.10 km^{2}), or 1.55%, is water.

== Education ==
Kilbuck Township is served by the Avonworth School District.

== Surrounding and adjacent neighborhoods ==
Kilbuck Township has eight land borders, including Glenfield and Aleppo Township to the west, Ohio Township to the north, Ross Township to the east, Avalon and Ben Avon Heights to the southeast, and Ben Avon and Emsworth to the south. Across the Ohio River to the south, Kilbuck Township runs adjacent with Neville Township.

== Government and politics ==
Presidential election results
Year	Republican	Democratic	Third parties
2024	47% 247	52% 272	0.8% 4
2020	50% 275	49% 272	0.5% 3
2016	51% 233	45% 207	4% 16
2012	57% 233	42% 170	1% 4

=== Councilmembers ===
- [2017-2019] Republicans-1(Fader), Democrats-1(Valois), Multiparty-1(Tomaro), Unknown-1(Dilmore)

== Demographics ==
Historical population
Census	Pop.	Note	%±
1970	1,694		—
1980	1,219		−28.0%
1990	890		−27.0%
2000	723		−18.8%
2010	697		−3.6%
2020	774		11.0%
2022 (est.)	759		−1.9%
U.S. Decennial Census

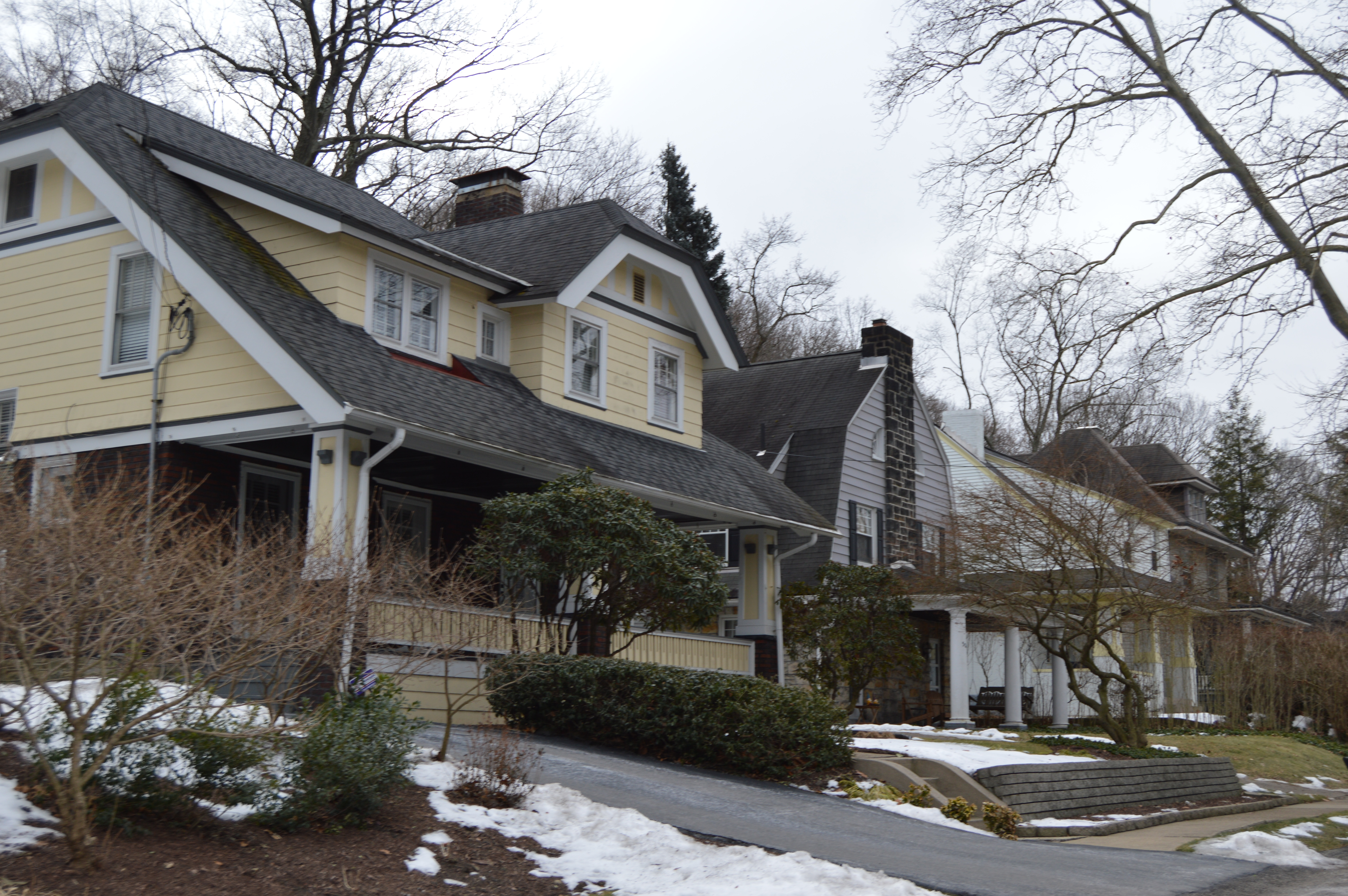
Neighborhood near Avon Park

At the 2000 census, there were 723 people, 310 households, and 217 families living in the township. The population density was 284.2 inhabitants per square mile (109.7/km^{2}). There were 318 housing units at an average density of 125.0 per square mile (48.3/km^{2}). The racial makeup of the township was 98.89% White, 0.55% African American, 0.14% Asian, and 0.41% from two or more races. Hispanic or Latino of any race were 0.14%.

There were 310 households, 26.8% had children under the age of 18 living with them, 63.2% were married couples living together, 4.2% had a female householder with no husband present, and 30.0% were non-families. 25.5% of households were made up of individuals, and 11.9% were one person aged 65 or older. The average household size was 2.33 and the average family size was 2.81.

The age distribution was 20.2% under the age of 18, 3.7% from 18 to 24, 24.5% from 25 to 44, 31.1% from 45 to 64, and 20.5% 65 or older. The median age was 46 years. For every 100 females, there were 104.8 males. For every 100 females age 18 and over, there were 101.0 males.

The median household income was $50,903 and the median family income was $60,795. Males had a median income of $44,688 versus $30,556 for females. The per capita income for the township was $32,582. About 3.2% of families and 6.2% of the population were below the poverty line, including 6.2% of those under age 18 and 5.1% of those age 65 or over.
