= Ben Avon Heights, Pennsylvania =

Borough in Pennsylvania, US

- Borough
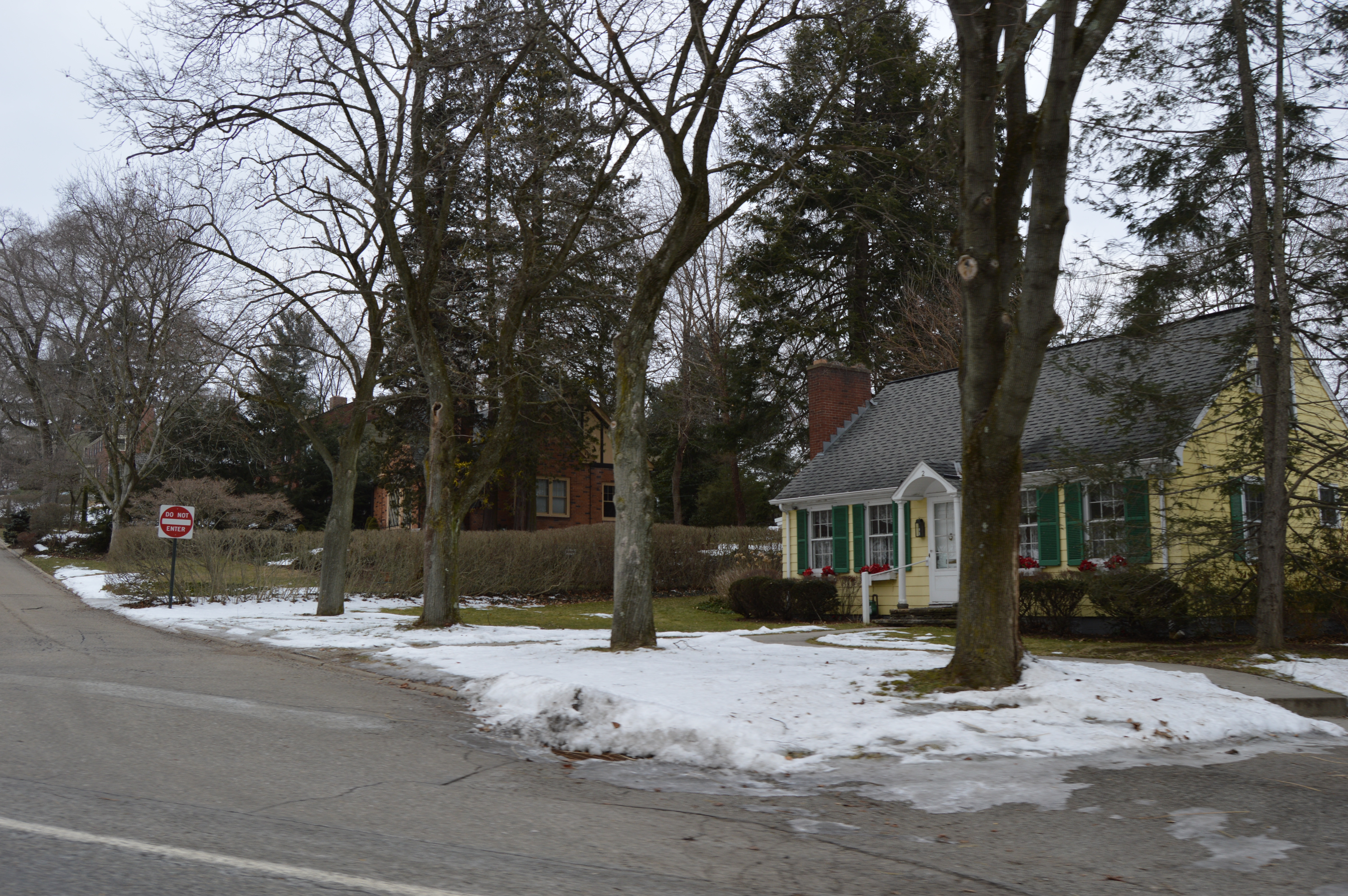
- Houses on Lynton Lane
- Etymology: Scottish for "hill by the waters"
- Location in Allegheny County and the U.S. state of Pennsylvania.
- Coordinates: 40°30′43″N 80°4′28″W
- Country: United States
- State: Pennsylvania
- County: Allegheny
- Incorporated: 1913

Area
  - Total: 0.17 sq mi (0.45 km^{2})
  - Land: 0.17 sq mi (0.45 km^{2})
  - Water: 0 sq mi (0.00 km^{2})
- Elevation: 1,135 ft (346 m)

Population (2020)
  - Total: 400
  - Density: 2,303.9/sq mi (889.56/km^{2})
- Time zone: UTC-5 (EST)
  - Summer (DST): UTC-4 (EDT)
- ZIP code: 15202
- Area code: 412
- FIPS code: 42-05520
- School District: Avonworth
- Website: www.benavonheightsborough.com

Ben Avon Heights is a borough in Allegheny County, Pennsylvania, United States, located on a hill above the Ohio River 9 miles (14 km) from the city of Pittsburgh. The population was 400 at the 2020 census. Ben Avon Heights is part of the Pittsburgh metropolitan area.

== History ==
Prior to 1906, the land that became Ben Avon Heights was farmland belonging to Samuel Taylor and John Wilson. In 1910, Walter Pringle Fraser of Ben Avon bought 84 acres (340,000 m^{2}) on the former Taylor farm, using forty of the acres to build the Ben Avon Country Club and golf course. The remaining 44 acres (180,000 m^{2}) were opened for a residential development, which he named Ben Avon Heights. Like neighboring Ben Avon, Ben Avon Heights appealed to Pittsburghers looking for rural summer homes away from the city. The borough was incorporated in 1913.

When the Ben Avon Country Club closed in 1917, it was divided into lots for additional housing. The Shannopin Country Club, the only commercial property in Ben Avon Heights, opened in 1920 with its clubhouse in Ben Avon Heights and golf course in neighboring Kilbuck Township. In the early 1930s, John I. Thompson purchased a portion of the original John Wilson Farm in Kilbuck Township and transformed the farmland into another residential area known as the Thompson Plan. The borough annexed the Thompson Plan in 1936, setting the boundaries of Ben Avon Heights to those of the present day.

The borough now contains 148 homes, a community park, and the club house of the Shannopin Country Club.

== Geography ==
Ben Avon Heights is located at 40°30′43″N 80°4′28″W.

According to the United States Census Bureau, the borough has a total area of 0.2 square miles (0.52 km^{2}), all land. Its average elevation is 1,135 feet (346 m) above sea level.

=== Surrounding neighborhoods ===
Ben Avon Heights has two borders, including Kilbuck Township to the north, east and west, and Avalon to the south.

== Demographics ==
Historical population
Census	Pop.	Note	%±
1920	130		—
1930	265		103.8%
1940	393		48.3%
1950	394		0.3%
1960	431		9.4%
1970	443		2.8%
1980	398		−10.2%
1990	373		−6.3%
2000	392		5.1%
2010	371		−5.4%
2020	400		7.8%

As of the census of 2000, there were 392 people, 138 households, and 117 families residing in the borough. The population density was 2,328.8 people per square mile (899.2 people/km^{2}). There were 144 housing units at an average density of 855.5 per square mile (330.3/km^{2}). The racial makeup of the borough was 98.72% White, 0.26% African American, 0.26% Asian, and 0.77% from two or more races. Hispanic or Latino of any race were 0.77% of the population.

There were 138 households, out of which 40.6% had children under the age of 18 living with them, 78.3% were married couples living together, 2.2% had a female householder with no husband present, and 14.5% were non-families. 13.8% of all households were made up of individuals, and 8.0% had someone living alone who was 65 years of age or older. The average household size was 2.84 and the average family size was 3.12.

In the borough the population was spread out, with 29.8% under the age of 18, 2.6% from 18 to 24, 29.6% from 25 to 44, 24.0% from 45 to 64, and 14.0% who were 65 years of age or older. The median age was 39 years. For every 100 females there were 107.4 males. For every 100 females age 18 and over, there were 102.2 males.

The median income for a household in the borough was $105,006, and the median income for a family was $111,218. Males had a median income of $100,000 versus $50,417 for females. The per capita income for the borough was $44,191. About 1.7% of families and 1.8% of the population were below the poverty line, including none of those under age 18 and 4.1% of those age 65 or over.

== Government and politics ==
Presidential Elections Results
Year	Republican	Democratic	Third Parties
2020	42% 129	56% 169	1% 3
2016	45% 115	50% 129	2% 14
2012	58% 147	42% 107	1% 1

=== Councilmembers ===
- [2022] Republicans-3 (Brown-President, Mihalko, Radcliffe), Democrats-1 (Stiller-Vice President), Unknown-5 (Dawley, Lope, Neunder), Mayor (Dismukes)
