= Emsworth, Pennsylvania =

Borough in Allegheny County, Pennsylvania, United States

- Borough
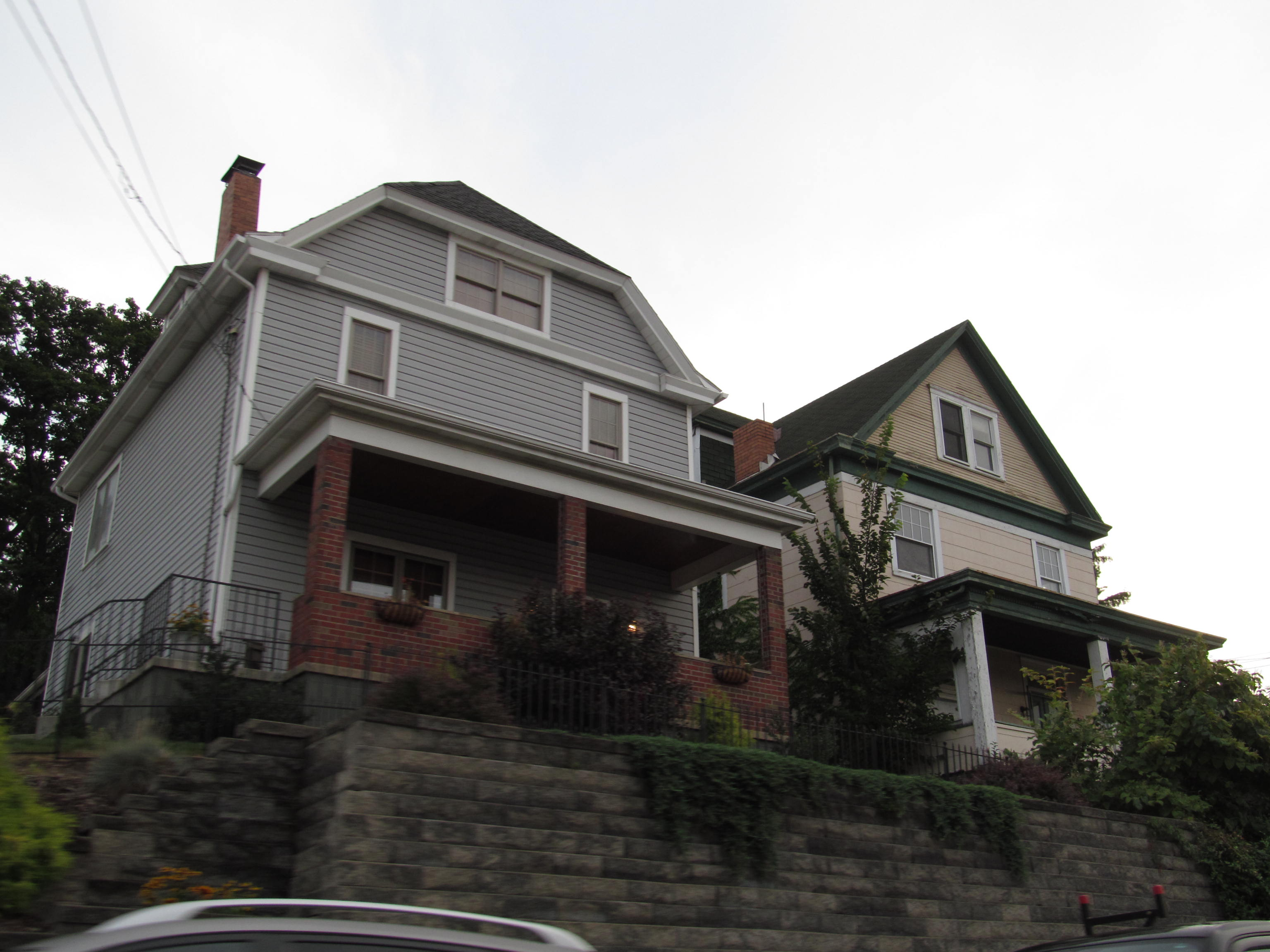

- Logo
- Interactive map of Emsworth, Pennsylvania
- Location within Pennsylvania Location within the United States
- Coordinates: 40°30′44″N 80°5′44″W
- Country: United States
- State: Pennsylvania
- County: Allegheny

Area
  - Total: 0.69 sq mi (1.79 km^{2})
  - Land: 0.57 sq mi (1.47 km^{2})
  - Water: 0.12 sq mi (0.32 km^{2})

Population (2020)
  - Total: 2,525
  - Density: 4,440.4/sq mi (1,714.46/km^{2})
- Time zone: UTC-5 (Eastern (EST))
  - Summer (DST): UTC-4 (EDT)
- ZIP code: 15202
- Area code: 412
- FIPS code: 42-23616
- Website: www.emsworthborough.com

Emsworth is a borough in Allegheny County, Pennsylvania, United States, along the Ohio River. The population was 2,525 at the 2020 census.

== History ==
The Court of Quarter Sessions established the Borough of Emsworth on July 14, 1896, by combining the villages of Clifton and Emsworth out of old Killbuck Township.

== Geography ==
Emsworth is located at 40°30′44″N 80°5′44″W (40.512318, -80.095577).

According to the United States Census Bureau, the borough has a total area of 0.7 square miles (1.8 km^{2}), of which 0.6 square miles (1.6 km^{2}) is land and 0.1 square miles (0.26 km^{2}), or 16.18%, is water.

== Climate ==
According to the Köppen Climate Classification system, Emsworth has a humid subtropical climate, abbreviated "Cfa" on climate maps. The hottest temperature recorded in Emsworth was 102 °F (38.9 °C) on July 15, 1995 and August 13, 1995, while the coldest temperature recorded was −13 °F (−25.0 °C) on January 21, 1994.

Climate data for Emsworth, Pennsylvania, 1991–2020 normals, extremes 1991–present
Month	Jan	Feb	Mar	Apr	May	Jun	Jul	Aug	Sep	Oct	Nov	Dec	Year
Record high °F (°C)	72 (22)	78 (26)	85 (29)	88 (31)	94 (34)	99 (37)	102 (39)	102 (39)	96 (36)	91 (33)	80 (27)	75 (24)	102 (39)
Mean daily maximum °F (°C)	39.3 (4.1)	41.7 (5.4)	51.2 (10.7)	64.0 (17.8)	73.7 (23.2)	81.2 (27.3)	85.4 (29.7)	84.1 (28.9)	78.0 (25.6)	65.8 (18.8)	53.8 (12.1)	43.1 (6.2)	63.4 (17.5)
Daily mean °F (°C)	29.9 (−1.2)	31.7 (−0.2)	40.3 (4.6)	51.5 (10.8)	61.6 (16.4)	70.0 (21.1)	74.5 (23.6)	72.9 (22.7)	66.4 (19.1)	54.7 (12.6)	43.5 (6.4)	34.5 (1.4)	52.6 (11.4)
Mean daily minimum °F (°C)	20.5 (−6.4)	21.7 (−5.7)	29.3 (−1.5)	39.1 (3.9)	49.5 (9.7)	58.9 (14.9)	63.6 (17.6)	61.7 (16.5)	54.7 (12.6)	43.7 (6.5)	33.1 (0.6)	25.9 (−3.4)	41.8 (5.4)
Record low °F (°C)	−13 (−25)	−10 (−23)	−2 (−19)	20 (−7)	29 (−2)	41 (5)	49 (9)	47 (8)	37 (3)	26 (−3)	12 (−11)	2 (−17)	−13 (−25)
Average precipitation inches (mm)	3.36 (85)	2.78 (71)	3.18 (81)	3.22 (82)	3.52 (89)	3.53 (90)	3.64 (92)	3.25 (83)	3.19 (81)	2.80 (71)	2.83 (72)	3.02 (77)	38.32 (974)
Average precipitation days (≥ 0.01 in)	14.4	12.5	12.0	12.8	12.4	11.1	10.3	9.0	8.8	10.1	10.7	12.2	136.3
Source 1: NOAA
Source 2: National Weather Service

== Surrounding and adjacent neighborhoods ==
Emsworth has two land borders, with Kilbuck Township from the west to the east and Ben Avon to the southeast. Across the Ohio River's main channel, Emsworth runs adjacent with Neville Township.

== Demographics ==
Historical population
Census	Pop.	Note	%±
1880	335		—
1900	958		—
1910	1,510		57.6%
1920	2,165		43.4%
1930	2,709		25.1%
1940	2,765		2.1%
1950	3,128		13.1%
1960	3,341		6.8%
1970	3,345		0.1%
1980	3,074		−8.1%
1990	2,892		−5.9%
2000	2,598		−10.2%
2010	2,449		−5.7%
2020	2,525		3.1%

At the 2000 census, there were 2,598 people in 1,153 households, including 642 families, in the borough. The population density was 4,519.1 inhabitants per square mile (1,744.8/km^{2}). There were 1,228 housing units at an average density of 2,136.0 per square mile (824.7/km^{2}). The racial makeup of the borough was 94.42% White, 3.58% African American, 0.04% Native American, 1.15% Asian, 0.04% from other races, and 0.77% from two or more races. Hispanic or Latino of any race were 0.42%.

There were 1,153 households, 24.3% had children under the age of 18 living with them, 42.5% were married couples living together, 10.0% had a female householder with no husband present, and 44.3% were non-families. 38.7% of households were made up of individuals, and 10.9% were one person aged 65 or older. The average household size was 2.17 and the average family size was 2.94.

The age distribution was 23.7% under the age of 18, 6.6% from 18 to 24, 35.3% from 25 to 44, 21.0% from 45 to 64, and 13.4% 65 or older. The median age was 36 years. For every 100 females, there were 101.6 males. For every 100 females age 18 and over, there were 92.9 males.

The median household income was $39,028 and the median family income was $50,333. Males had a median income of $39,702 versus $24,224 for females. The per capita income for the borough was $19,471. About 2.9% of families and 5.4% of the population were below the poverty line, including 1.5% of those under age 18 and 6.4% of those age 65 or over.

== Government and politics ==
Presidential election results
Year	Republican	Democratic	Third parties
2020	42% 630	55% 821	2% 34
2016	44% 553	51% 641	5% 67
2012	46% 549	53% 632	1% 20

=== Council members ===
- [2017–2019] Democrats: 1 (Lenz), Republicans: 0, Unknown: 4 (Petoski, Kenderski, Rumph, Lang)

== Notable people ==
- Michael Fincke (born in Pittsburgh, but considers Emsworth his hometown)

== See also ==
- List of cities and towns along the Ohio River
