= Ben Avon, Pennsylvania =

Borough in Pennsylvania, US

- Borough
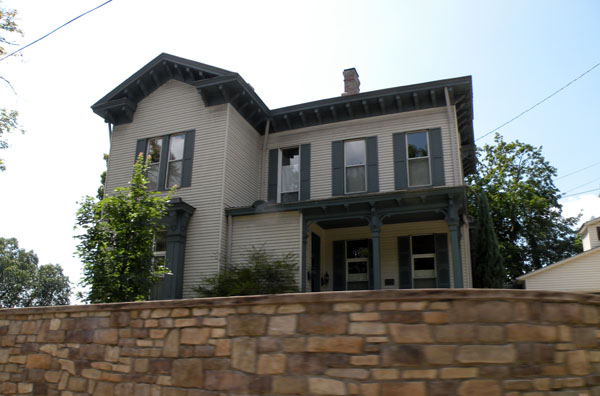
- The Arthurs-Johnson House, a historic site in the borough
- Etymology: Scottish for "hill by the waters"
- Location in Allegheny County and the U.S. state of Pennsylvania.
- Coordinates: 40°30′27″N 80°4′56″W
- Country: United States
- State: Pennsylvania
- County: Allegheny
- Incorporated: January 1891

Area
  - Total: 0.46 sq mi (1.19 km^{2})
  - Land: 0.38 sq mi (0.98 km^{2})
  - Water: 0.077 sq mi (0.20 km^{2})
- Elevation: 928 ft (283 m)

Population (2020)
  - Total: 1,918
  - Density: 5,060.1/sq mi (1,953.73/km^{2})
- Time zone: UTC-5 (EST)
  - Summer (DST): UTC-4 (EDT)
- ZIP code: 15202
- Area code: 412
- FIPS code: 42-05504
- School District: Avonworth
- Website: Ben Avon Borough

Ben Avon is a borough in Allegheny County, Pennsylvania, United States, along the Ohio River. The population was 1,918 at the 2020 census. It is part of the Pittsburgh metropolitan area.

The name, Ben Avon, comes from Scottish for "hill by the waters".

== History ==
Ben Avon was incorporated as a borough in January 1891, from Kilbuck Township.

Like many early suburbs, Ben Avon was originally linked to Pittsburgh by train. One of the first homes in the area, the Arthurs-Johnson House, was built at a bend in the Ohio River above the Pittsburgh and Fort Wayne Railroad, a route that was known to George Washington. The house was built by a merchant from Allegheny City looking for a summer retreat from the steel industry. To make the commute from Pittsburgh easier, a commuter railroad was built. Laurel Run station was located by the Arthurs-Johnson House. The new railroad made Ben Avon and bordering Avalon a desirable place for wealthy merchants and executives to live. Ben Avon had its own newspaper, the Ben Avon Forum, which, in July 1930, wrote, "Ben Avon is the most desirable community to live in the entire Allegheny County - and if pressed, we might take an even larger territory."

In 1928, plans were underway to build the Pittsburgh and Ohio River Boulevard (currently Ohio River Boulevard, along the northern bank of the Ohio River from Pittsburgh to the mouth of the Beaver River at Rochester, Pennsylvania). Residents feared that the new road would change their community. The wide, heavily traveled boulevard divided the community and made it difficult for pedestrians to get from one side of Ben Avon to the other. Additionally, by 1950, the train station at Laurel Run was closed.

Today, Ohio River Boulevard, outside of Ben Avon proper (there are no commercial properties along the boulevard in Ben Avon), is lined with commercial businesses, gas stations, thrift shops, and auto repair shops, but the houses and old railroad tracks from the early 20th century remain as reminders of the era when Ben Avon was a pleasant summer retreat from Pittsburgh's steel industry.

== Geography ==
Ben Avon is located at 40°30′27″N 80°4′56″W (40.507418, -80.082162).

According to the United States Census Bureau, the borough has a total area of 0.5 square miles (1.3 km^{2}), of which 0.4 square miles (1.0 km^{2}) is land and 0.1 square miles (0.26 km^{2}) (14.89%) is water.

Its average elevation is 928 feet (283 m) above sea level.

=== Surrounding and adjacent neighborhoods ===
Ben Avon has three land borders, including Kilbuck Township to the north, Avalon to the east, and Emsworth to the west. Across the Ohio River's main channel, Ben Avon runs adjacent with Neville Island (Neville Township).

== Demographics ==
Historical population
Census	Pop.	Note	%±
1900	859		—
1910	1,828		112.8%
1920	2,198		20.2%
1930	2,472		12.5%
1940	2,516		1.8%
1950	2,465		−2.0%
1960	2,553		3.6%
1970	2,713		6.3%
1980	2,314		−14.7%
1990	2,096		−9.4%
2000	1,917		−8.5%
2010	1,781		−7.1%
2020	1,918		7.7%

As of the census of 2000, there were 1,917 people, 784 households, and 512 families residing in the borough. The population density was 4,805.1 people per square mile (1,850.4 per km^{2}). There were 825 housing units at an average density of 2,067.9 per square mile (796.3 per km^{2}). The racial makeup of the borough was 95.93% White, 2.45% African American, 0.37% Native American, 0.26% Asian, 0.05% from other races, and 0.94% from two or more races. Hispanic or Latino of any race were 0.47% of the population.

There were 784 households, out of which 32.0% had children under the age of 18 living with them, 51.9% were married couples living together, 11.6% had a female householder with no husband present, and 34.6% were non-families. 28.6% of all households were made up of individuals, and 8.4% had someone living alone who was 65 years of age or older. The average household size was 2.43 and the average family size was 3.05.

In the borough the population was spread out, with 25.3% under the age of 18, 5.2% from 18 to 24, 33.9% from 25 to 44, 23.7% from 45 to 64, and 11.9% who were 65 years of age or older. The median age was 37 years. For every 100 females, there were 87.2 males. For every 100 females age 18 and over, there were 83.1 males.

The median income for a household in the borough was $54,926, and the median income for a family was $66,875. Males had a median income of $44,107 versus $33,393 for females. The per capita income for the borough was $26,408. About 2.7% of families and 4.5% of the population were below the poverty line, including 4.6% of those under age 18 and 10.4% of those age 65 or over.

== Government and politics ==
Presidential Elections Results
Year	Republican	Democratic	Third Parties
2020	31% 397	66% 834	1% 24
2016	36% 394	59% 652	5% 59
2012	45% 470	53% 551	2% 17

== See also ==
- List of cities and towns along the Ohio River
