= 2012 United States presidential election in Pennsylvania =

- November 6, 2012
- Turnout: 67.6% (▼1.0 pp)

Nominee	Barack Obama	Mitt Romney
Party	Democratic	Republican
Home state	Illinois	Massachusetts
Running mate	Joe Biden	Paul Ryan
Electoral vote	20	0
Popular vote	2,990,274	2,680,434
Percentage	51.97%	46.59%

Obama
40–50%
50–60%
60–70%
70–80%
80–90%
90–100%
Romney
40–50%
50–60%
60–70%
70–80%
80–90%
90–100%
Tie
President before election
Barack Obama
Democratic
Elected President
Barack Obama
Democratic

The 2012 United States presidential election in Pennsylvania took place on November 6, 2012, as part of the 2012 United States presidential election in which all 50 states plus the District of Columbia participated. The primary election to select the Democratic and Republican candidates had been held on April 24, 2012. Pennsylvania voters chose 20 electors to represent them in the Electoral College via a popular vote pitting incumbent Democratic President Barack Obama and his running mate, Vice President Joe Biden, against Republican challenger and former Massachusetts Governor Mitt Romney and his running mate, Congressman Paul Ryan. Pennsylvania's electoral vote number was a reduction from the 2008 delegation, which had 21 electors. This change was due to reapportionment following the 2010 United States census. Pennsylvania's 20 electoral votes are allotted on a winner-take-all basis.

Obama received 51.97% of the vote, beating Romney's 46.59%. Also on the ballot were physician Jill Stein of the Green Party and former New Mexico Governor Gary Johnson of the Libertarian Party, who received 0.37% and 0.87%, respectively. Other candidates could run as write-in candidates, which received a total 0.2% of the vote. The state had been considered likely, but not certain, to go to Obama. While the state had voted for a Democrat since 1992, it remained competitive, especially after Bush's loss of only 2.5% in 2004. Its competitiveness was attributable to the stark contrast between the state's diverse, urban voters in areas such as Philadelphia and Pittsburgh; and rural, blue-collar voters in the rest of the state. However, massive margins in the urban regions of the state and victories in the Philadelphia suburbs, Lehigh Valley, Scranton, and Erie delivered a considerable victory for the president. Obama received over 85% of the vote in Philadelphia County, the highest vote share in its history as of 2024.

Regardless, Romney improved on John McCain's 10.32% loss in the state in 2008. Just like in 2008, Pennsylvania was the most Republican of the three Rust Belt swing states (including Wisconsin and Michigan) in 2012. Five counties that voted for Obama in 2008 voted for Romney in 2012: Berks, Cambria, Carbon, Chester, and Elk. This made Obama the first Democrat to win the presidency without carrying Cambria County since Woodrow Wilson in 1916, and made him the first Democrat to win the White House without carrying Elk County since Franklin D. Roosevelt in 1940, and the first to do so without carrying Carbon County since John F. Kennedy in 1960.

As of the 2024 presidential election, this is the last time that Chester County voted for the Republican candidate, that Luzerne County voted for the Democratic candidate, and that Pennsylvania voted more Democratic than the nation as a whole.

This was the last time a Democratic presidential nominee has won every Northeastern electoral vote. Pennsylvania voted twice for Republican Donald Trump in 2016 and 2024, and Maine's 2nd congressional district voted for Trump in all three of his runs. This was also the last time Pennsylvania voted to the left of Virginia, with Virginia being the only former Confederate state never to have voted for Trump.

== Primary elections ==
=== Democratic primary ===
Incumbent Barack Obama ran unopposed on the Democratic primary ballot on April 24. He received 616,102 votes. There were 19,082 write-in votes. In the floor vote taken at the Democratic National Convention, 242 Pennsylvania delegates voted for Obama, while the other 8 of the state's 250 allocated votes were not announced.

=== Republican primary ===
Four candidates were on the Republican primary ballot: Mitt Romney, former Senator from Pennsylvania Rick Santorum, U.S. Representative from Texas Ron Paul, and former Speaker of the House Newt Gingrich. His home state was set to be the make-or-break primary for Santorum. He had just lost 3 primaries to Romney, and Romney appeared poised to become the presumptive nominee by achieving a prohibitive lead.

As momentum in the Republican race built for Romney, Santorum suspended his campaign for four days to meet with 'movement conservatives' to strategize. Rather than returning to campaigning the next Monday, Rick and Karen Santorum canceled campaign events scheduled right after Easter weekend to be in the hospital with their youngest daughter.

In deference to the sick child, Romney ceased airing attack ads, replacing them with positive introductory ones.

On April 10, Santorum formally suspended his campaign. On May 7, he endorsed Romney. Santorum and Gingrich both released their delegates to Romney in August, shortly before the Republican National Convention.

Candidate	Votes	Percentage	Projected delegates	Actual delegate vote
Mitt Romney	468,374	57.8%	31	67
Rick Santorum	149,056	18.4%	4	0
Ron Paul	106,148	13.1%	5	5
Newt Gingrich	84,537	10.4%	3	0
Write-in votes	2,819	0.3%		
Unprojected delegates			29	
Total:	810,934	100%	72	72

== General election ==
=== Polling ===
In statewide opinion polling, incumbent Barack Obama consistently led challenger Mitt Romney by a margin of between 2 and 12 percentage points. Analysts rated Pennsylvania as a "likely Democratic" or "Democratic-leaning" state in the presidential race. On the morning of the election, polling aggregator FiveThirtyEight estimated that there was a 99% likelihood that Obama would win Pennsylvania's electoral votes. At the time, Pennsylvania's electoral votes had gone to the Democratic candidate in every presidential election since Bill Clinton won it in 1992. The average of the last three polls had Obama leading Romney 51% to 46%, which was very close to the actual result.

During the summer, there was significant spending on political advertisements in Pennsylvania, by both the Obama campaign and pro-Romney groups such as Crossroads GPS and Americans for Prosperity. However, because Obama maintained a consistent lead in polling, Pennsylvania came to be considered a "safe state" for Obama, and campaign advertising subsided substantially in August. This changed in October, when pro-Romney groups Restore Our Future and Americans for Job Security spent $3 million on advertising in Pennsylvania. Later that month, the Obama campaign and the Romney campaign both launched their own advertising campaigns in Pennsylvania. On November 1, the Republican National Committee announced that it would spend $3 million on television ads in Pennsylvania in the final days of the campaign. In total, pro-Romney spending in Pennsylvania was estimated to amount to as much as $12 million, much more than Obama campaign spending. The Obama campaign characterized the pro-Romney spending surge as "an act of sheer desperation", while the Romney campaign argued that they had a realistic chance of winning the state. In the end, Obama carried the state by a modest margin, albeit narrower than his 2008 landslide over Senator John McCain.

=== Predictions ===
Source	Ranking	As of
Huffington Post	Lean D	November 6, 2012
CNN	Lean D	November 6, 2012
New York Times	Tossup	November 6, 2012
Washington Post	Lean D	November 6, 2012
RealClearPolitics	Tossup	November 6, 2012
Sabato's Crystal Ball	Lean D	November 5, 2012
FiveThirtyEight	Solid D	November 6, 2012

=== Results ===
2012 U.S. presidential election in Pennsylvania
Party	Candidate	Votes	%
Democratic	Barack Obama (incumbent)	2,990,274	51.97
Republican	Mitt Romney	2,680,434	46.59
Libertarian	Gary Johnson	49,991	0.87
Green	Jill Stein	21,341	0.37
Other	Other	11,630	0.20
Total votes		5,753,670	100.0

==== By county ====
County	Barack Obama Democratic		Mitt Romney Republican		Gary Johnson Libertarian		Jill Stein Green		Various candidates Other parties		Margin		Total votes cast
County	#	%	#	%	#	%	#	%	#	%	#	%	Total votes cast
Adams	15,091	35.40%	26,767	62.80%	437	1.03%	162	0.38%	168	0.39%	-11,676	-27.40%	42,625
Allegheny	352,687	56.54%	262,039	42.01%	5,196	0.83%	2,159	0.35%	1,746	0.28%	90,648	14.53%	623,827
Armstrong	9,045	30.43%	20,142	67.77%	297	1.00%	118	0.40%	119	0.40%	-11,097	-37.34%	29,721
Beaver	37,055	45.86%	42,344	52.41%	794	0.98%	281	0.35%	319	0.39%	-5,289	-6.55%	80,793
Bedford	4,788	22.01%	16,702	76.79%	143	0.66%	64	0.29%	53	0.24%	-11,914	-54.78%	21,750
Berks	83,011	48.64%	84,702	49.63%	1,832	1.07%	775	0.45%	356	0.21%	-1,691	-0.99%	170,676
Blair	16,276	32.32%	33,319	66.16%	464	0.92%	182	0.36%	124	0.25%	-17,043	-33.84%	50,365
Bradford	8,624	36.64%	14,410	61.21%	243	1.03%	149	0.63%	114	0.48%	-5,786	-24.57%	23,540
Bucks	160,521	49.97%	156,579	48.74%	2,863	0.89%	1,053	0.33%	250	0.08%	3,942	1.23%	321,266
Butler	28,550	31.83%	59,761	66.62%	819	0.91%	315	0.35%	254	0.28%	-31,211	-34.79%	89,699
Cambria	24,249	40.06%	35,163	58.10%	712	1.18%	402	0.66%	0	0.00%	-10,914	-18.04%	60,526
Cameron	724	34.07%	1,359	63.95%	19	0.89%	9	0.42%	14	0.66%	-635	-29.88%	2,125
Carbon	11,580	45.07%	13,504	52.56%	356	1.39%	141	0.55%	113	0.44%	-1,924	-7.49%	25,694
Centre	34,176	48.90%	34,001	48.65%	1,049	1.50%	400	0.57%	260	0.37%	175	0.25%	69,886
Chester	124,311	49.22%	124,840	49.43%	2,082	0.82%	740	0.29%	603	0.24%	-529	-0.21%	252,576
Clarion	5,056	31.08%	10,828	66.55%	208	1.28%	94	0.58%	84	0.52%	-5,772	-35.47%	16,270
Clearfield	11,121	34.62%	20,347	63.34%	339	1.06%	160	0.50%	155	0.48%	-9,226	-28.72%	32,122
Clinton	5,734	43.08%	7,303	54.86%	171	1.28%	57	0.43%	46	0.35%	-1,569	-11.78%	13,311
Columbia	10,937	42.48%	14,236	55.30%	324	1.26%	126	0.49%	121	0.47%	-3,299	-12.82%	25,744
Crawford	13,883	39.02%	20,901	58.75%	436	1.23%	168	0.47%	187	0.52%	-7,018	-19.73%	35,575
Cumberland	44,367	39.90%	64,809	58.29%	1,191	1.07%	447	0.40%	377	0.34%	-20,442	-18.39%	111,191
Dauphin	64,965	52.26%	57,450	46.22%	1,128	0.91%	465	0.37%	293	0.24%	7,515	6.04%	124,301
Delaware	171,792	60.16%	110,853	38.82%	2,002	0.70%	917	0.32%	0	0.00%	60,939	21.34%	285,564
Elk	5,463	41.14%	7,579	57.08%	117	0.88%	79	0.59%	41	0.31%	-2,116	-15.94%	13,279
Erie	68,036	57.12%	49,025	41.16%	1,087	0.91%	471	0.40%	495	0.42%	19,011	15.96%	119,114
Fayette	21,971	45.16%	26,018	53.48%	365	0.75%	151	0.31%	144	0.30%	-4,047	-8.32%	48,649
Forest	896	38.55%	1,383	59.51%	23	0.99%	10	0.43%	12	0.52%	-487	-20.96%	2,324
Franklin	18,995	30.00%	43,260	68.32%	571	0.90%	252	0.40%	242	0.38%	-24,265	-38.32%	63,320
Fulton	1,310	21.06%	4,814	77.38%	50	0.80%	21	0.34%	26	0.42%	-3,504	-56.32%	6,221
Greene	5,852	40.23%	8,428	57.94%	116	0.80%	68	0.47%	82	0.56%	-2,576	-17.71%	14,546
Huntingdon	5,409	30.57%	11,979	67.71%	135	0.76%	116	0.66%	53	0.30%	-6,570	-37.14%	17,692
Indiana	14,473	39.71%	21,257	58.33%	385	1.06%	206	0.57%	123	0.34%	-6,784	-18.62%	36,444
Jefferson	4,787	26.33%	13,048	71.78%	173	0.95%	89	0.49%	81	0.44%	-8,261	-45.45%	18,178
Juniata	2,547	26.55%	6,862	71.52%	83	0.87%	43	0.45%	60	0.63%	-4,315	-44.97%	9,595
Lackawanna	61,838	62.87%	35,085	35.67%	743	0.76%	349	0.35%	336	0.34%	26,753	27.20%	98,351
Lancaster	88,481	39.62%	130,669	58.50%	2,527	1.13%	759	0.34%	915	0.41%	-42,188	-18.88%	223,351
Lawrence	17,513	44.69%	21,047	53.71%	334	0.85%	142	0.36%	153	0.39%	-3,534	-9.02%	39,189
Lebanon	19,900	35.05%	35,872	63.18%	589	1.04%	219	0.39%	197	0.35%	-15,972	-28.13%	56,777
Lehigh	78,283	53.17%	66,874	45.42%	1,331	0.90%	514	0.35%	222	0.15%	11,409	7.75%	147,224
Luzerne	64,307	51.51%	58,325	46.72%	1,261	1.01%	546	0.44%	406	0.33%	5,982	4.79%	124,845
Lycoming	15,203	32.58%	30,658	65.69%	409	0.88%	223	0.48%	176	0.38%	-15,455	-33.11%	46,669
McKean	5,297	34.95%	9,545	62.99%	178	1.17%	88	0.58%	46	0.30%	-4,248	-28.04%	15,154
Mercer	24,232	47.48%	25,925	50.79%	487	0.95%	219	0.43%	176	0.34%	-1,693	-3.31%	51,039
Mifflin	4,273	26.03%	11,939	72.73%	107	0.65%	52	0.32%	45	0.27%	-7,666	-46.70%	16,416
Monroe	35,221	55.89%	26,867	42.63%	596	0.95%	233	0.37%	106	0.17%	8,354	13.26%	63,023
Montgomery	233,356	56.52%	174,381	42.24%	3,253	0.79%	1,210	0.29%	669	0.16%	58,975	14.28%	412,869
Montour	3,053	38.85%	4,652	59.19%	96	1.22%	30	0.38%	28	0.36%	-1,599	-20.34%	7,859
Northampton	67,606	51.59%	61,446	46.89%	1,188	0.91%	495	0.38%	309	0.24%	6,160	4.70%	131,044
Northumberland	13,072	39.19%	19,518	58.51%	422	1.27%	200	0.60%	144	0.43%	-6,446	-19.32%	33,356
Perry	5,685	29.59%	13,120	68.28%	238	1.24%	85	0.44%	87	0.45%	-7,435	-38.69%	19,215
Philadelphia	588,806	85.24%	96,467	13.97%	2,892	0.42%	2,162	0.31%	449	0.06%	492,339	71.27%	690,776
Pike	10,210	43.86%	12,786	54.93%	194	0.83%	89	0.38%	0	0.00%	-2,576	-11.07%	23,279
Potter	1,897	26.06%	5,231	71.86%	78	1.07%	36	0.49%	37	0.51%	-3,334	-45.80%	7,279
Schuylkill	24,546	42.29%	32,278	55.61%	617	1.06%	286	0.49%	321	0.55%	-7,732	-13.32%	58,048
Snyder	4,687	31.11%	10,073	66.85%	180	1.19%	62	0.41%	66	0.44%	-5,386	-35.74%	15,068
Somerset	9,436	27.69%	23,984	70.38%	334	0.98%	188	0.55%	136	0.40%	-14,548	-42.69%	34,078
Sullivan	1,034	35.06%	1,868	63.34%	30	1.02%	17	0.58%	0	0.00%	-834	-28.28%	2,949
Susquehanna	6,935	38.28%	10,800	59.62%	202	1.12%	107	0.59%	72	0.40%	-3,865	-21.34%	18,116
Tioga	5,357	31.34%	11,342	66.35%	195	1.14%	110	0.64%	90	0.53%	-5,985	-35.01%	17,094
Union	6,109	37.39%	9,896	60.57%	184	1.13%	79	0.48%	69	0.42%	-3,787	-23.18%	16,337
Venango	7,945	35.70%	13,815	62.07%	299	1.34%	108	0.49%	90	0.40%	-5,870	-26.37%	22,257
Warren	6,995	40.44%	10,010	57.86%	205	1.19%	89	0.51%	0	0.00%	-3,015	-17.42%	17,299
Washington	40,345	42.48%	53,230	56.04%	854	0.90%	321	0.34%	228	0.24%	-12,885	-13.56%	94,978
Wayne	8,396	38.74%	12,896	59.50%	195	0.90%	120	0.55%	67	0.31%	-4,500	-20.76%	21,674
Westmoreland	63,722	37.58%	103,932	61.29%	1,426	0.84%	492	0.29%	0	0.00%	-40,210	-23.71%	169,572
Wyoming	5,061	42.45%	6,587	55.26%	152	1.28%	72	0.60%	49	0.42%	-1,526	-12.81%	11,921
York	73,191	38.52%	113,304	59.63%	1,985	1.04%	749	0.39%	776	0.41%	-40,113	-21.11%	190,005
Totals	2,990,274	51.95%	2,680,434	46.57%	49,991	0.87%	21,341	0.37%	13,580	0.24%	309,840	5.38%	5,755,620

Counties that flipped from Democratic to Republican

- Berks (largest city: Reading)
- Cambria (largest city: Johnstown)
- Carbon (largest borough: Lehighton)
- Chester (largest city: West Chester)
- Elk (largest city: St. Marys)

==== By congressional district ====
Despite losing the state overall, Romney won 13 of the 18 congressional districts.

District	Romney	Obama	Representative
1st	16.89%	82.26%	Bob Brady
2nd	8.95%	90.41%	Chaka Fattah
3rd	55.60%	43.05%	Mike Kelly
4th	57.07%	41.51%	Jason Altmire
4th	57.07%	41.51%	Scott Perry
5th	56.95%	41.35%	Glenn Thompson
6th	50.57%	48.12%	Jim Gerlach
7th	50.36%	48.53%	Pat Meehan
8th	49.42%	49.35%	Mike Fitzpatrick
9th	62.82%	35.87%	Bill Shuster
10th	60.11%	38.46%	Tom Marino
11th	53.90%	44.57%	Lou Barletta
12th	57.81%	40.94%	Mark Critz
12th	57.81%	40.94%	Keith Rothfus
13th	32.91%	66.17%	Allyson Schwartz
14th	30.64%	67.99%	Mike Doyle
15th	50.78%	47.87%	Charlie Dent
16th	52.35%	46.25%	Joe Pitts
17th	43.26%	55.38%	Tim Holden
17th	43.26%	55.38%	Matt Cartwright
18th	57.95%	40.99%	Tim Murphy

== See also ==
- United States presidential elections in Pennsylvania
- 2012 Republican Party presidential debates and forums
- 2012 Republican Party presidential primaries
- Results of the 2012 Republican Party presidential primaries
- Pennsylvania Republican Party
