= North Hills (Pennsylvania) =

Northern suburbs of Pittsburgh, Pennsylvania

The North Hills are the inner-ring northern suburbs of Pittsburgh, Pennsylvania, United States. The independent suburban municipalities located in the North Hills are Ross, West View, Shaler, West Deer, Franklin Park, Marshall, Bradford Woods, McCandless, Hampton, Pine, Richland, Fox Chapel, Indiana, O'Hara, Reserve, Ohio.

Suburban and exurban municipalities located even further north, north of the Allegheny County line —such as Mars and Cranberry—are not typically considered part of this region.

== School districts ==
- North Allegheny School District
  - Serving the townships of Marshall, McCandless, Franklin Park Borough and Bradford Woods Borough.
- Pine-Richland School District
  - Serving the townships of Pine and Richland.
- Deer Lakes School District
  - Serving the townships of West Deer, Frazer, and East Deer.
- Hampton Township School District
  - Serving the township of Hampton.
- Fox Chapel Area School District
  - Serving the townships of Indiana and O'Hara. Also serves Fox Chapel, Blawnox, Aspinwall, and Sharpsburg.
- Avonworth School District
  - Serving the townships of Kilbuck and Ohio. Also serves Ben Avon, Ben Avon Heights, and Emsworth, which are not within the North Hills.
- North Hills School District
  - Serving Ross Township and West View borough.
- Shaler Area School District
  - Serving the townships of Shaler and Reserve. Also serves Millvale and Etna.
