= North Allegheny School District =

School district in Pennsylvania

Coordinates: 40.56751°N 80.03123°W

Address
- 200 Hillvue Lane Pittsburgh, Allegheny County, Pennsylvania, 15237-5344; United States

District information
- Type: Public
- Motto: Preparing All Students For Success In A Changing World
- Grades: K-12
- Established: 1948
- Superintendent: Dr. Brendan Hyland
- Schools: 7 elementary, 3 middle, 2 high schools
- Budget: $177.5 million

Students and staff
- Students: 8,493
- Staff: 581
- Colors: Black & Gold

Other information
- Website: northallegheny.org

North Allegheny School District is one of the largest suburban public school in the Pittsburgh area. Located in McCandless, Pennsylvania, about 12 miles (19 km) north of Pittsburgh. It was established in 1948 and serves an area of 48 square miles (120 km^{2}), including Marshall Township, McCandless Township, and the boroughs of Bradford Woods and Franklin Park.

North Allegheny School District operates 12 schools.

== List of schools ==
=== Elementary Schools (K-5) ===
- Bradford Woods Elementary School
- Franklin Elementary School
- Hosack Elementary School
- Ingomar Elementary School
- Marshall Elementary School
- McKnight Elementary School
- Peebles Elementary School

=== Middle School (Grades 6-8) ===
- Ingomar Middle School
- Carson Middle School
- Marshall Middle School

=== High Schools ===
- North Allegheny Intermediate High School (grades 9-10)
- North Allegheny Senior High School (grades 11-12)

== Notable alumni ==
- Tim Manoa - Former professional American football player, Cleveland Browns, Indianapolis Colts
- Brian Baschnagel - Former professional American football player, Chicago Bears
- Chris Devlin - Former professional American football player,Cincinnati Bengals, Chicago Bears
- Gregg Garrity - Former professional American football player, Pittsburgh Steelers, Philadelphia Eagles
- Thomas Keiser - Former professional American football player, Carolina Panthers, San Diego Chargers, Arizona Cardinals
- Mike McMahon (American football) - Former professional American football player, Detroit Lions, Philadelphia Eagles, Minnesota Vikings
- Bob Riley (offensive lineman) - Former professional American football player, Minnesota Vikings, Cincinnati Bengals, San Francisco 49ers, Atlanta Falcons
- Joey Porter Jr. - Football Player for the Pittsburgh Steelers
- Mack Leftwich - Offensive Coordinator for Texas Tech University
- Tom Carroll (pitcher) - Former Major League Baseball player, Cincinnati Reds
- Cory Sullivan - Former Major League Baseball player, Colorado Rockies, New York Mets, Houston Astros
- James Meeker - Former Major League Baseball player, Milwaukee Brewers
- Cole Young - Baseball player for the Seattle Mariners
- Jake Herbert - Two-time NCAA wrestling champion for Northwestern University, World Championships silver medalist in freestyle wrestling
- Teague Moore - NCAA wrestling champion at Oklahoma State, gold medalist at University World Championships in freestyle wrestling
- Jason Lammers - Head Coach Niagara University NCAA Hockey
- Ayden Owens-Delerme - Decathlete
- Sarah Schupansky - Professional soccer player
- Warren Woodrow "Woody" Hoburg - NASA Astronaut
- Mark Nordenberg - Former chancellor of the University of Pittsburgh
- Melissa Hart - Former United States Representative
- Frank Nicotero - Comedian
