= Bergdahl =

Bergdahl may refer to:

== People ==
- Bowe Bergdahl (born 1986), United States Army soldier, who was held captive from June 2009 to May 2014 by the Taliban
- Johan Bergdahl (born 1962), Swedish fencer
- Leif Bergdahl (born 1941), Swedish physician and politician
- Michael Bergdahl, author and professional business speaker

== Places ==
- Bergdahl Lake, lake in Watonwan County, Minnesota, United States
