= Pennsylvania Route 910 =

State highway in Allegheny County, Pennsylvania, US

Pennsylvania Route 910

Route information
- Maintained by PennDOT
- Length: 19.21 mi (30.92 km)

Major junctions
- West end: I-79 in Wexford
- US 19 in Wexford; PA 8 near Gibsonia
- East end: PA 28 / Freeport Road in Harmarville

Location
- Country: United States
- State: Pennsylvania
- Counties: Allegheny

Highway system
- Pennsylvania State Route System; Interstate; US; State; Scenic; Legislative
← PA 909	→ PA 911

Pennsylvania Route 910 (PA 910) is an east–west state highway in Allegheny County, Pennsylvania, in the Pittsburgh Metropolitan Area. It travels nineteen miles (31 km) between Interstate 79 (I-79) in Wexford and PA 28 in Harmarville.

== Route description ==
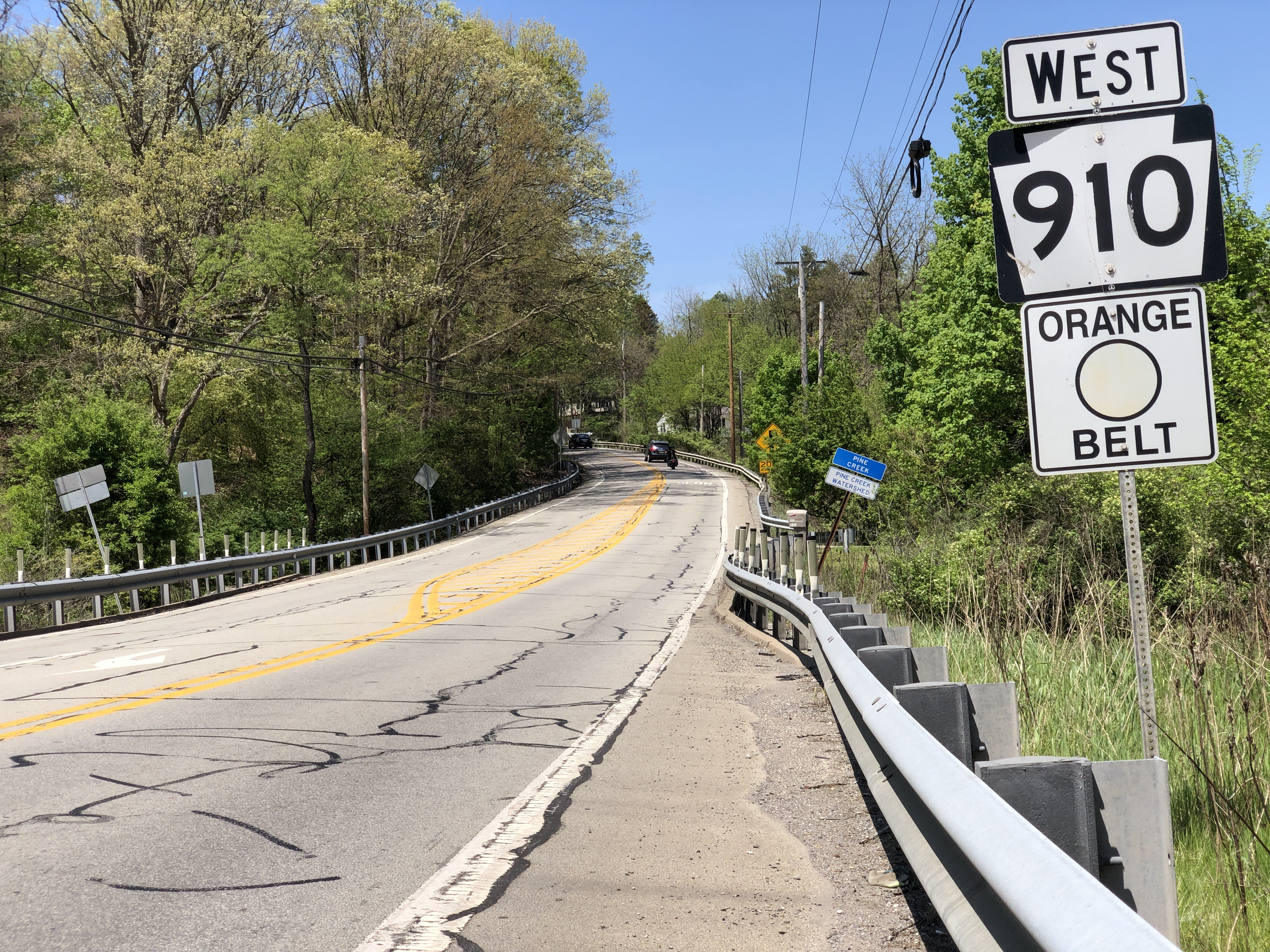
PA 910 westbound in Marshall Township

PA 910 begins at an interchange with I-79 on the border of the borough of Franklin Park and Marshall Township, heading east-northeast on three-lane undivided Wexford Bayne Road into Marshall Township, carrying two westbound lanes and one eastbound lane. At this point, the route is concurrent with the Orange Belt of the Allegheny County Belt System. The road passes a few businesses before narrowing to two lanes and running past residential subdivisions. PA 910 continues into Pine Township and comes to an interchange with US 19 in Wexford. At this point, the route becomes Wexford Road and heads east through forested areas. Farther east, the road passes through a mix of woods and residential development, entering Richland Township. In this area, PA 910 becomes Gibsonia Road and passes over I-76 (Pennsylvania Turnpike) before heading through wooded areas of homes. The route passes through Gibsonia and crosses the P&W Subdivision railroad line, which is owned by CSX and operated by the Buffalo and Pittsburgh Railroad, passing through more wooded residential areas as it comes to an intersection with PA 8 in a commercial area.

Past this, the road turns southeast and runs near more housing subdivisions, crossing into West Deer Township and passing near businesses. At the intersection with Oak Road, the Orange Belt splits from PA 910 by heading east on that road, and PA 910 curves south. The route turns southeast and then south again, passing a mix of fields, woods, and homes. At the Cedar Ridge Road intersection, the Yellow Belt joins PA 910 for the remainder of the route and the road heads into Indiana Township, coming to another bridge over the Pennsylvania Turnpike. The road curves southeast through woods before passing through the residential community of Dorseyville. The route heads east and crosses over the Pennsylvania Turnpike again, making another turn to the southeast through wooded areas of development. PA 910 heads south and passes over the Pennsylvania Turnpike a fourth time, reaching the community of Indianola. The route continues southeast through wooded areas of residential and commercial development a short distance to the west of the Pennsylvania Turnpike, entering Harmar Township. The road becomes Indianola Road and passes through forests, becoming a three-lane road with two eastbound lanes and one westbound lane. PA 910 makes a sharp turn to the southwest and becomes a two-lane divided highway, coming to an interchange with the PA 28 freeway. At this point, the route widens into a four-lane divided highway and passes businesses, reaching its terminus at Freeport Road.

== Major intersections ==
The entire route is in Allegheny County.

Location	mi	km	Destinations	Notes
Franklin Park	0.0	0.0	I-79 – Pittsburgh, Erie	Western terminus; west end of Orange Belt overlap; exit 73 on I-79
Pine Township	2.3– 2.5	3.7– 4.0	US 19 (Perry Highway)	Interchange
Richland Township	8.9	14.3	PA 8 (William Flinn Highway) – Butler, Pittsburgh	
West Deer Township	11.2	18.0	Orange Belt (Oak Road)	East end of Orange Belt overlap
West Deer Township	12.9	20.8	Yellow Belt (Cedar Ridge Road)	West end of Yellow Belt overlap
Harmar Township	19.0	30.6	PA 28 (Allegheny Valley Expressway) – Pittsburgh, Tarentum, New Kensington	Exit 11 on PA 28
Harmar Township	19.2	30.9	Yellow Belt (Freeport Road) to I-76 / Penna Turnpike – Oakmont, Hulton Bridge, New Kensington	Eastern terminus; east end of Yellow Belt overlap; former PA 28
1.000 mi = 1.609 km; 1.000 km = 0.621 mi: Concurrency terminus
