= Allegheny High School (disambiguation) =

Allegheny High School is a former high school located in Pittsburgh, Pennsylvania and listed on the National Register of Historic Places.

Allegheny High School may also refer to:

- East Allegheny High School, North Versailles, Pennsylvania
- North Allegheny Intermediate High School, McCandless, Pennsylvania
- North Allegheny Senior High School, Wexford, Pennsylvania
- South Allegheny Middle/Senior High School, McKeesport, Pennsylvania
- West Allegheny Senior High School, North Fayette Township, Pennsylvania

== See also ==
- Alleghany High School (disambiguation)
- Allegany High School
- Allegheny College
