= Data philanthropy =

Aspect of culture

Data philanthropy refers to the practice of private companies donating corporate data. This data is usually donated to nonprofits or donation-run organizations that have difficulty keeping up with expensive data collection technology. The concept was introduced through the United Nations Global Pulse initiative in 2011 to explore corporate data assets for humanitarian, academic, and societal causes. For example, anonymized mobile data could be used to track disease outbreaks, or data on consumer actions may be shared with researchers to study public health and economic trends.

== Definition ==
A large portion of data collected from the internet consists of user-generated content, such as blogs, social media posts, and information submitted through lead generation and data forms. Additionally, corporations gather and analyze consumer data to gain insight into customer behavior, identify potential markets, and inform investment decisions. United Nations Global Pulse director Robert Kirkpatrick has referred to this type of data as "massive passive data" or "data exhaust."

== Challenges ==
While data philanthropy can enhance development policies, making users' private data available to various organizations raises concerns regarding privacy, ownership, and the equitable use of data. Different techniques, such as differential privacy and alphanumeric strings of information, can allow access to personal data while ensuring user anonymity. However, even if these algorithms work, re-identification may still be possible.

Another challenge is convincing corporations to share their data. The data collected by corporations provides them with market competitiveness and insight regarding consumer behavior. Corporations may fear losing their competitive edge if they share the information they have collected with the public.

Numerous moral challenges are also encountered. In 2016, Mariarosaria Taddeo, a digital ethics professor at the University of Oxford, proposed an ethical framework to address them.

== Sharing strategies ==
The goal of data philanthropy is to create a global data commons where companies, governments, and individuals can contribute anonymous, aggregated datasets. The United Nations Global Pulse offers four different tactics that companies can use to share their data that preserve consumer anonymity:

1. Share aggregated and derived data sets for analysis under nondisclosure agreements (NDA)
2. Allow researchers to analyze data within the private company's own network under NDAs
3. Real-Time Data Commons: data pooled and aggregated among multiple companies of the same industry to protect competitiveness
4. Public/Private Alerting Network: companies mine data behind their own firewalls and share indicators

== Application in various fields ==
Many corporations take part in data philanthropy, including social networking platforms (e.g., Facebook, Twitter), telecommunications providers (e.g., Verizon, AT&T), and search engines (e.g., Google, Bing). Collecting and sharing anonymized, aggregated user-generated data is made available through data-sharing systems to support research, policy development, and social impact initiatives. By participating in such efforts, these organizations contribute to causes regarded as beneficial to society, allowing institutions to give back meaningfully. With the onset of technological advancements, the sharing of data on a global scale and an in-depth analysis of these data structures could mitigate the effects of global issues such as natural disasters and epidemics. Robert Kirkpatrick, the Director of the United Nations Global Pulse, has argued that this aggregated information is beneficial for the common good and can lead to developments in research and data production in a range of varied fields.

=== Digital disease detection ===
Health researchers use digital disease detection by collecting data from various sources—such as social media platforms (e.g., Twitter, Facebook), mobile devices (e.g., cell phones, smartphones), online search queries, mobile apps, and sensor data from wearables and environmental sensors—to monitor and predict the spread of infectious diseases. This approach allows them to track and anticipate outbreaks of epidemics (e.g., COVID-19, Ebola), pandemics, vector-borne diseases (e.g., malaria, dengue fever), and respiratory illnesses (e.g., influenza, SARS), improving response and intervention strategies for the spread of diseases.

In 2008, Centers for Disease Control and Prevention collaborated with Google and launched Google Flu Trends, a website that tracked flu-related searches and user locations to track the spread of the flu. Users could visit Google Flu Trends to compare the amount of flu-related search activity versus the reported numbers of flu outbreaks on a graphical map. One drawback of this method of tracking was that Google searches are sometimes performed due to curiosity rather than when an individual is suffering from the flu. According to Ashley Fowlkes, an epidemiologist in the CDC Influenza division, "The Google Flu Trends system tries to account for that type of media bias by modeling search terms over time to see which ones remain stable." Google Flu Trends is no longer publishing current flu estimates on the public website; however, visitors to the site can still view and download previous estimates. Current data can be shared with verified researchers.

A study from the Harvard School of Public Health (HSPH), published in the October 12, 2012 issue of Science, discussed how phone data helped curb the spread of malaria in Kenya. The researchers mapped phone calls and texts made by 14,816,521 Kenyan mobile phone subscribers. When individuals left their primary living location, the destination and length of journey were calculated. This data was then compared to a 2009 malaria prevalence map to estimate the disease's commonality in each location. Combining all this information, the researchers could estimate the probability of an individual carrying malaria and map the movement of the disease. This research can be used to track the spread of similar diseases.

=== Humanitarian aid ===
Calling patterns of mobile phone users can determine the socioeconomic standings of the populace, which can be used to deduce "its access to housing, education, healthcare, and basic services such as water and electricity." Researchers from Columbia University and Karolinska Institute used daily SIM card location data from both before and after the 2010 Haiti earthquake to estimate the movement of people both in response to the earthquake and during the related 2010 Haiti cholera outbreak. Their research suggests that mobile phone data can provide rapid and accurate estimates of population movements during disasters and outbreaks of infectious disease. Big data can also provide information on looming disasters and can assist relief organizations in rapid-response and locating displaced individuals. By analyzing specific patterns within this 'big data', governments and NGOs can enhance responses to disruptive events such as natural disasters, disease outbreaks, and global economic crises. Leveraging real-time information enables a deeper understanding of individual well-being, allowing for more effective interventions. Corporations utilize digital services, such as human sensor systems, to detect and solve impending problems within communities. This is a strategy used by the private sector to anonymously share customer information for public benefit, while preserving user privacy.

=== Impoverished areas ===
Poverty still remains a worldwide issue, with over 2.5 billion people currently impoverished. Statistics indicate the widespread use of mobile phones, even within impoverished communities. Additional data can be collected through Internet access, social media, utility payments and governmental statistics. Data-driven activities can lead to the accumulation of 'big data', which in turn can assist international non-governmental organizations in documenting and evaluating the needs of underprivileged populations. Through data philanthropy, NGOs can distribute information while cooperating with governments and private companies.

=== Corporate ===
Data philanthropy incorporates aspects of social philanthropy by allowing corporations to create profound impacts through the act of giving back by dispersing proprietary datasets. The public sector collects and preserves information, considered an essential asset. Companies track and analyze users' online activities to gain insight into their needs related to new products and services. These companies view the welfare of the population as key to business expansion and progression by using their data to highlight global citizens' issues. Experts in the private sector emphasize the importance of integrating diverse data sources—such as retail, mobile, and social media data—to develop essential solutions for global challenges. In Data Philanthropy: New Paradigms for Collaborative Problem Solving (2022), authors Stefaan Verhulst and Andrew Young discuss this approach. Robert Kirkpatrick argues that, although sharing private information carries inherent risks, it ultimately yields public benefits, supporting the common good. – via Harvard Business Review (subscription required) The digital revolution causes an extensive production of big data that is user-generated and available on the web. Corporations accumulate information on customer preferences through the digital services they utilize and products they purchase to gain clear insights on their clientele and future market opportunities. However, the rights of individuals concerning privacy and ownership of data are controversial, as governments and other institutions can use this collective data for unethical purposes.

=== Academia ===
Data philanthropy is crucial in the academic field. Researchers face numerous challenges in obtaining data, which is often restricted to a select group of individuals who have exclusive access to certain resources, such as social media feeds. This limited access allows these researchers to generate additional insights and pursue innovative studies. For instance, X Corp. (formerly Twitter Inc.) offers access to its real-time APIs at different price points, such as $5,000 for the ability to read 1,000,000 posts each month, a cost that frequently exceeds the financial capabilities of many researchers.

=== Human rights ===
Data philanthropy aids the human rights movement by assisting in dispersing evidence for truth commissions and war crimes tribunals. Advocates for human rights gather data on abuses occurring within countries, which is then used for scientific analysis to raise awareness and drive action. For example, non-profit organizations compile data from human rights monitors in war zones to assist the UN High Commissioner for Human Rights. This data uncovers inconsistencies in the number of war casualties, leading to international attention and influencing global policy discussions.

== See also ==
- Big data
- Open data
- Freedom of information
- Data security
- Public-benefit corporation
