= The Dog Who Had Kittens =

1991 picture book by Polly M. Robertus

- Front cover, designed by Janet Stevens
- Author: Polly M. Robertus
- Illustrator: Janet Stevens
- Language: English
- Genre: Children's picture book
- Published: 1991 (Holiday House)
- Publication place: USA
- Media type: Print (hardback)
- Pages: 32 (unpaginated)
- ISBN: 9780823408603
- OCLC: 21970192
- First appeared in the Cricket magazine, March 1988, vol 15, no. 15

The Dog Who Had Kittens is a 1991 children's picture book by Polly M. Robertus and illustrated by Janet Stevens. It is about a Basset Hound who finds himself adopting some kittens.

== Reception ==
The Dog Who Had Kittens has been reviewed by Books for Keeps that wrote "A really good book: it doesn't duck the issues, the animals remain true to their likely characteristics and we're left with wry smiles on our faces." and Kirkus Reviews called it "Good fun."

Booklist found it "An amusing combination of text and art, especially appealing for children who know and love dogs." and the School Library Journal wrote "The story .. is fairly long and often descriptive, but the unusual situation and large pictures should sustain the attention of older preschoolers and will definitely appeal to primary-grade children."

It has also been recommended by public libraries.

== Awards and nominations ==
1993 Colorado Children's Book Award - winner
1993 Nevada Young Readers' Award - winner
1994 Young Hoosier Award - winner
1994 Washington Children's Choice Picture Book Award - winner
