= Pittsburgh Chinese Church =

Church in Pennsylvania, US

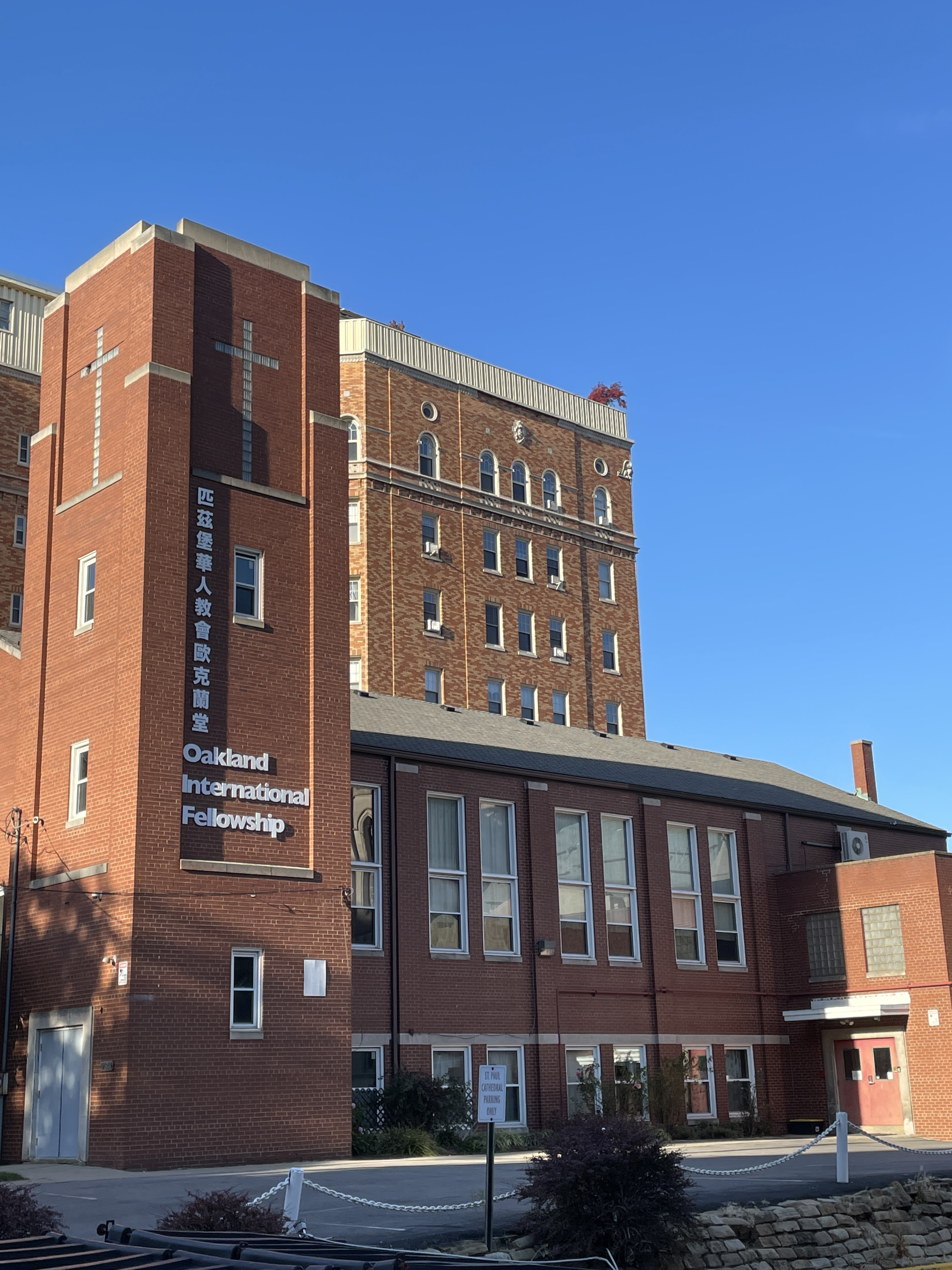

Religion
- Affiliation: Interdenominational
- Province: Evangelicalism
- Region: Pittsburgh, Pennsylvania
- Ecclesiastical or organisational status: Presbyterian Polity
- Leadership: Pastor: Hans Sun; Pastor: James Fullmer; Pastor: Benjamin Lee; Pastor: Hugo Cheng; Pastor: Terence Liu (2013–); Assistant Pastor: Ed Jiang (2008–2011); Assistant Pastor: Michael Liang (2012–)
- Year consecrated: 1965
- Status: Active

Location
- Location: McCandless, Pennsylvania and Oakland, Pittsburgh, Pennsylvania
- State: Pennsylvania
- Interactive map of Pittsburgh Chinese Church
- Coordinates: 40.447857°N 79.950474°W

Specifications
- Direction of façade: Northeast
- Materials: Brick and morter

Website
- PittsburghChineseChurch.org (Chinese); PCCOakland.org

Pittsburgh Chinese Church is an independent, interdenominational and evangelical church with locations in McCandless, Pennsylvania and the Oakland neighborhood of Pittsburgh, Pennsylvania.

Its main congregation is in McCandless Township. Its Oakland location, acronymed "PCCO", consists of the Mandarin speaking "Chinese congregation" and "OIF" (Oakland International Fellowship).

ACF (Asian Christian Fellowship) is a ministry of the McCandless location. It includes students from many area universities including Carnegie Mellon University, the University of Pittsburgh, the University of Pittsburgh Medical Center, and Duquesne University. It works loosely with InterVarsity Christian Fellowship.

== History ==
In March 1937, Mrs. Lizzie Shaw gathered 13 children together in Pittsburgh's Chinatown (just west of today's PNC Financial Services First Side Center building) to establish the Pittsburgh Chinese Mission.

In 1980, the Mission was formally registered and established as the Pittsburgh Chinese Church.

In 1965, PCC started holding regular Sunday worship services. Sermons were initially preached mainly in Mandarin and translated into English and Cantonese. Due to an increase in English-speakers, PCC established separate English and Chinese church services in 1991 with a monthly combined worship and communion.

In 1984, PCC purchased the original Perrysville church building at 4101 Perrysville Ave with a main grand entrance at 4050 Vinceton St. As of July 2009, that building now houses the Rose of Sharon Church.

In March 1995, PCC began to hold worship services every Sunday afternoon in the basement of the First Baptist Church of Pittsburgh at 159 North Bellefield Avenue in Oakland to cater to the large University town population.

In 1997, PCC began the search for a new facility to be geographically closer to growing, local Chinese populations, notably in Wexford and McCandless, and to increase physical space.

In 2001, PCC Perrysville purchased a 37,000-square-foot (3,400 m^{2}) former public school building on 5 acres (20,000 m^{2}) of hilly, grassy land. PCC named the new church "Abundant Grace" as a transliteration of the way "Perry Highway" sounds in Mandarin.

In 2005, PCCO purchased the former building of New Hope Christian Community at 134 North Dithridge Street, only 1,500 feet (460 m) from PCCO's former location and adjacent to the Cathedral of Saint Paul in Pittsburgh.

In March 2008, PCCO installed Assistant Pastor Ed Jiang, a Westminster Theological Seminary graduate with a focus in Biblical Counseling. In September 2008, PCCO installed Terence Liu as Assistant Pastor; Liu is a University of Pittsburgh graduate who worked in the IT industry in California prior to devoting to the Lord. In November 2008, PCC Perry installed Pastor Benjamin Lee, the former pastor of the Chinese Christian Church Somerset in Somerset, New Jersey.

Then, when Assistant Pastor Ed Jiang resigned from his post in 2011 and left PCCO the next year, PCCO added another Assistant Pastor Michael Liang of Chicago, and he was formally installed in Sep 2012.

On June 1, 2013, Assistant Pastor Terence Liu was formally ordained as Pastor Terence Liu. Since then, PCCO has two pastors, Pastor Hugo Cheng (heading the Oakland International Fellowship), and Pastor Terence Liu (heading the Chinese congregation), and one assistant pastor, Michael Liang (in charge of children and youth fellowship and Bible studies).
