= Ross Township, Allegheny County, Pennsylvania =

Township in Pennsylvania, US

Ross Township, Pennsylvania
- Township
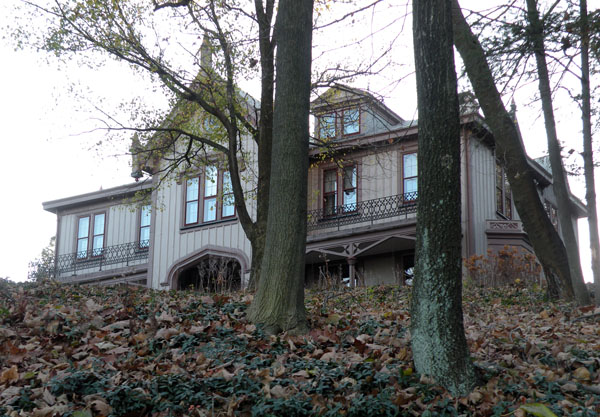
- House in the historic Evergreen Hamlet neighborhood

- Seal
- Interactive map of Ross Township, Pennsylvania
- Location within Pennsylvania Location within the United States
- Coordinates: 40°31′35″N 80°1′19″W
- Country: United States
- State: Pennsylvania
- County: Allegheny
- Incorporated: June 26, 1809
- Named for: James Ross

Government
  - Type: Board of Commissioners
  - President of the Board of Commissioners: Daniel DeMarco (D)
  - Township Manager: Ronald Borczyk
  - Assistant Manager: Jessica Cranshaw

Area
  - Total: 14.47 sq mi (37.49 km^{2})
  - Land: 14.47 sq mi (37.49 km^{2})
  - Water: 0 sq mi (0.00 km^{2})

Population (2020)
  - Total: 33,176
  - Estimate (2021): 33,176
  - Density: 2,292/sq mi (884.9/km^{2})
- Time zone: UTC−5 (Eastern (EST))
  - Summer (DST): UTC−4 (EDT)
- ZIP codes: 15116, 15202, 15209, 15212, 15214, 15229, 15237
- Area code: 412
- FIPS code: 42-003-66264
- Website: ross.pa.us

Ross Township is a township in Allegheny County, Pennsylvania, United States. It is adjacent to the northern border of Pittsburgh. The population of the township was 33,176 at the 2020 census. While most of the township is residential, a retail corridor is located along McKnight Road along with business districts on U.S. Route 19 and Babcock Boulevard.

Ross Township, along with the nearby borough of West View, comprises part of the North Hills School District, and both participate in the multi-municipality Northland Public Library.

== History ==
On June 26, 1809, John McKnight, along with 30 other residents of Pine Township, petitioned the courts of Allegheny for the formation of a new township. In the November term, permission was granted and Ross Township was born. It was called Ross after a prominent Pittsburgh attorney James Ross. He represented Western Pennsylvania at the convention to ratify the Pennsylvania Constitution in 1790. Ross was a United States Senator and the personal land lawyer to George Washington.

Many of the early settlers lived in fear of the Native Americans, since many did not agree with Chief Cornplanter's treaty with Washington in 1784. In 1794, Casper Reel decided to finally settle in the area after being formerly chased out. His twin sons, David and Casper Jr., became the first white men born north of Pittsburgh.

One of Ross Township's earliest claims to fame was the roads that passed through the area. The Native Americans traveled the Venango Path, later called the Franklin Road. It was also one of the most important routes used by Commodore Oliver Perry in the Battle of Lake Erie during the War of 1812. After his victory, the road was once again changed to the Perrysville Plank Road. During this time, the road had large wooden planks on one side to assist in traveling during inclement weather. It was only when State Senator Herman P. Brandt petitioned to have the road paved from the city line to Perrysville in the 1920s. The road changed names once again to what is now known as Perry Highway.

Along the road was built the Hiland Presbyterian Church circa 1799. The church, which still stands today, served as the hub of the community with most of the early families worshiping there and as its use as the town meeting hall. Adjoined to church property was the Perrysville School. This was the setting of one of both Pittsburgh's and Ross Township's most infamous prison escapes. On January 30, 1902, Katherine Soffel, wife of the warden of the Allegheny Jail, helped the Biddle Brothers, whom she was in love with, escape. It was during this escape through a blinding snow storm that they found themselves on Perrysville Plank Road looking for shelter, transportation and something to eat. Having nowhere else to stay, they broke into the one room Perrysville school house and warmed up next to the pot-bellied stove still warm from the day's classes. Wanting something to eat, the Biddles traveled up the road to the White House Hotel, where they requested six ham sandwiches and a pint of whiskey. Realizing they were short on cash, Ed Biddle pulled out a woman's pocketbook and paid for them. He did not have enough room in his coat, so he drew his gun in full sight of the bartender, Christ Weller. After many failed attempts to steal horses and a buggy, they found an open barn along Three Degree Road, where their attempt proved successful. Word of their escape broke out in the morning of January 31, in which they were tracked and later caught in Butler County. Along with these infamous strangers, some of the residence of Ross had fame in the lives as well. Herman P. Brandt was a State Senator, Casper Reel & Jacob Weitzel were famed Revolutionary War Soldiers, Simon Girty was a renegade traitor to the settlers and has been written about many times all over the world.

In 1908, the Perrysville Volunteer Fire Company was formed.

On August 1, 1962, Northway Mall in Ross Township opened with 62 stores. The unique mall was the site of the first enclosed mall in the state of Pennsylvania. Today, it operates as The Block Northway.

In the summer of 1967, Jim Delligatti invented the Big Mac sandwich in the kitchen of his McDonald's, located on McKnight Road.

In 1984, the Pittsburgh Chinese Church purchased the original Perrysville church building at 4101 Perrysville Ave with a main grand entrance at 4050 Vinceton St. In 2001, the PCC left this location for its current building at 8711 Old Perry Highway.

Ross' borders changed over the course of time when Allegheny City was formed to the south and Shaler Township was formed to the east. Both took place before the turn of the 20th century. In 1905, the borough of West View seceded from Ross and was formed in the southwest corner of Ross Township. Since then, the borders have remained relatively unchanged.

== Geography ==
Ross Township is located at 40°31′35″N 80°1′19″W. According to the U.S. Census Bureau, the township has a total area of 14.4 square miles (37 km^{2}). A small amount of land is covered with water.

=== Communities and neighborhoods ===
- Glenshaw
- Keown Station
- Holly Hill
- Berkeley Hills
- Greybrooke
- Kinvara
- Perrysville
  U.S. Route 19 through Ross' Perrysville neighborhood
- North Hills Estates
- Laurel Gardens
- Evergreen Heights
- Highcliff
- McKnight
- McKnight Business District
- McKnight Village
- Northway
- Babcock Business District
- Evergreen Hamlet
- White Oak Heights

=== Neighboring and inner communities ===
Ross Township has eleven borders, including McCandless to the north, Hampton Township to the northeast, Shaler Township to the east, Reserve Township and the Pittsburgh neighborhoods of Summer Hill, Perry North and Brighton Heights to the south, the borough of Bellevue to the southwest, Kilbuck and Ohio Townships to the west, and the borough of Franklin Park to the northwest. Ross Township also entirely surrounds the borough of West View.

== Demographics ==
Historical population
Census	Pop.	Note	%±
1870	1,623		—
1880	1,976		21.7%
1890	2,202		11.4%
1900	2,671		21.3%
1910	3,812		42.7%
1920	4,949		29.8%
1930	8,581		73.4%
1940	10,827		26.2%
1950	15,744		45.4%
1960	25,952		64.8%
1970	32,892		26.7%
1980	35,102		6.7%
1990	33,482		−4.6%
2000	32,662		−2.4%
2010	31,105		−4.8%
2020	33,176		6.7%
2021 (est.)	33,176		0.0%
U.S. Decennial Census

As of the census of 2010, there were 31,105 people, 14,125 households, and 8,310 families residing in the township. The population density was 2,160.1 inhabitants per square mile (834.0/km^{2}). There were 14,909 housing units at an average density of 1,035.3 units per square mile (399.7 units/km^{2}). The racial makeup of the township was 94.0% White, 2.1% Black or African American, 0.1% Native American, 2.5% Asian, 0.0% Pacific Islander, 0.3% from other races, and 1.0% from two or more races. Hispanic or Latino of any race were 1.1% of the population.

There were 14,125 households, out of which 22.3% had children under the age of 18 living with them, 47.7% were married couples living together, 8.0% had a female householder with no husband present, and 41.2% were non-families. 31.8% of all households were made up of individuals, and 31.5% had someone living alone who was 65 years of age or older. The average household size was 2.15 and the average family size was 2.81.

In the township the population was spread out, with 17.5% under the age of 18, 6.6% from 18 to 24, 25.4% from 25 to 44, 29.8% from 45 to 64, and 20.8% who were 65 years of age or older. The median age was 45.4 years. For every 100 females there were 88.5 males. For every 100 females age 18 and over, there were 85.3 males.

The median income for a household in the township was $57,354, and the median income for a family was $75,319. Males had a median income of $46,124 versus $32,529 for females. The per capita income for the township was $33,121. About 4.3% of families and 6.8% of the population were below the poverty line, including 6.0% of those under age 18 and 9.2% of those age 65 or over.

== Government and politics ==
Ross Township is a first-class township in the Commonwealth of Pennsylvania. The township is administered by an elected Board of Commissioners, composed of nine members who each represent a Ward in the Township. As of 2024, the current Board is:

- Dan DeMarco, Esq. (D, Ward 1; president)
- Chris Eyster, Esq. (D, Ward 2)
- Sarah Poweska (D, Ward 3; vice president)
- Joe Laslavic (D/R, Ward 4)
- William McKellar (D, Ward 5)
- Haley Warden-Rodgers (D, Ward 6)
- Patrick Mullin (D, Ward 7)
- Denise Rickenbrode (D, Ward 8)
- Joseph Muha (R, Ward 9)

Presidential Elections Results
Year	Republican	Democratic	Third Parties
2024	Lost	WON	Lost
2020	46% 9,613	52% 10,930	1% 290
2016	50% 8,691	48% 8,410	2% 301
2012	53% 9,206	45% 7,813	2% 199

== Education ==
Ross Township is served by the North Hills School District. The district also serves West View Borough.

North Hills High School consistently scores in the top 20% of Pennsylvania Public High Schools with its PSSA scores.

- 2022-2023 226th out of 674
- 2021-2022 118th out of 674
- 2020-2021 246th out of 674
- 2018-2019 129th out of 674
- 2017-2018 133rd out of 674
- 2016-2017 152nd out of 674
- 2015-2016 121st out of 674
- 2014-2015 121st out of 674
- 2013-2014 200th out of 674
- 2012-2013 129th out of 674
- 2011-2012 131st out of 674
- 2010-2011 91st out of 674

== See also ==
- North Hills Village Shopping Center
