= Brian Alderson =

Brian Alderson may refer to:

- Brian Alderson (footballer) (1950–1997), Scottish footballer
- Brian Alderson (critic) (born 1930), British literary critic and translator
