= Franklin Park, Pennsylvania =

Borough in Pennsylvania, US

- Borough
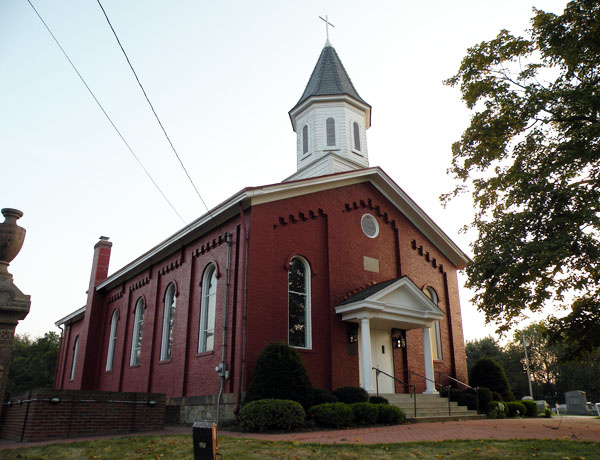
- Trinity Evangelical Lutheran Church

- Location in Allegheny County and the state of Pennsylvania.
- Coordinates: 40°35′26″N 80°5′31″W
- Country: United States
- State: Pennsylvania
- County: Allegheny
- Established: 1823

Government
  - Mayor: Cristen Fiffik
  - Council President: Uday Palled

Area
  - Total: 13.54 sq mi (35.08 km^{2})
  - Land: 13.54 sq mi (35.07 km^{2})
  - Water: 0.0039 sq mi (0.01 km^{2})
- Elevation: 1,260 ft (384 m)

Population (2020)
  - Total: 15,479
  - Density: 1,143.2/sq mi (441.38/km^{2})
- Time zone: UTC-5 (Eastern (EST))
  - Summer (DST): UTC-4 (EDT)
- ZIP code: 15090, 15143, 15237
- Area codes: 412, 724, 878
- FIPS code: 42-27552
- Website: www.franklinparkborough.us

Franklin Park is a borough in Allegheny County, Pennsylvania, United States. The population was 15,479 at the 2020 census. It is a suburb of the Pittsburgh metropolitan area.

== History ==
Franklin Park was originally part of Western Pennsylvania's Depreciation Lands, but in 1823 residents petitioned to secede from Ohio Township and a new township was formed. In August 1823, the township included land from what is today Franklin Park, Bradford Woods, and Marshall Township. Marshall Township was founded forty years later, while Bradford Woods seceded from Marshall in 1915.

Originally, Franklin Township had no towns, but the area's scattered businesses and residencies (which consisted of farms, schools, country stores and churches) enjoyed a thriving oil and gas industry in the late 1800s and early 1900s. Subdivisions came after World War II and in August 1961 it finally became a borough.

== Geography ==
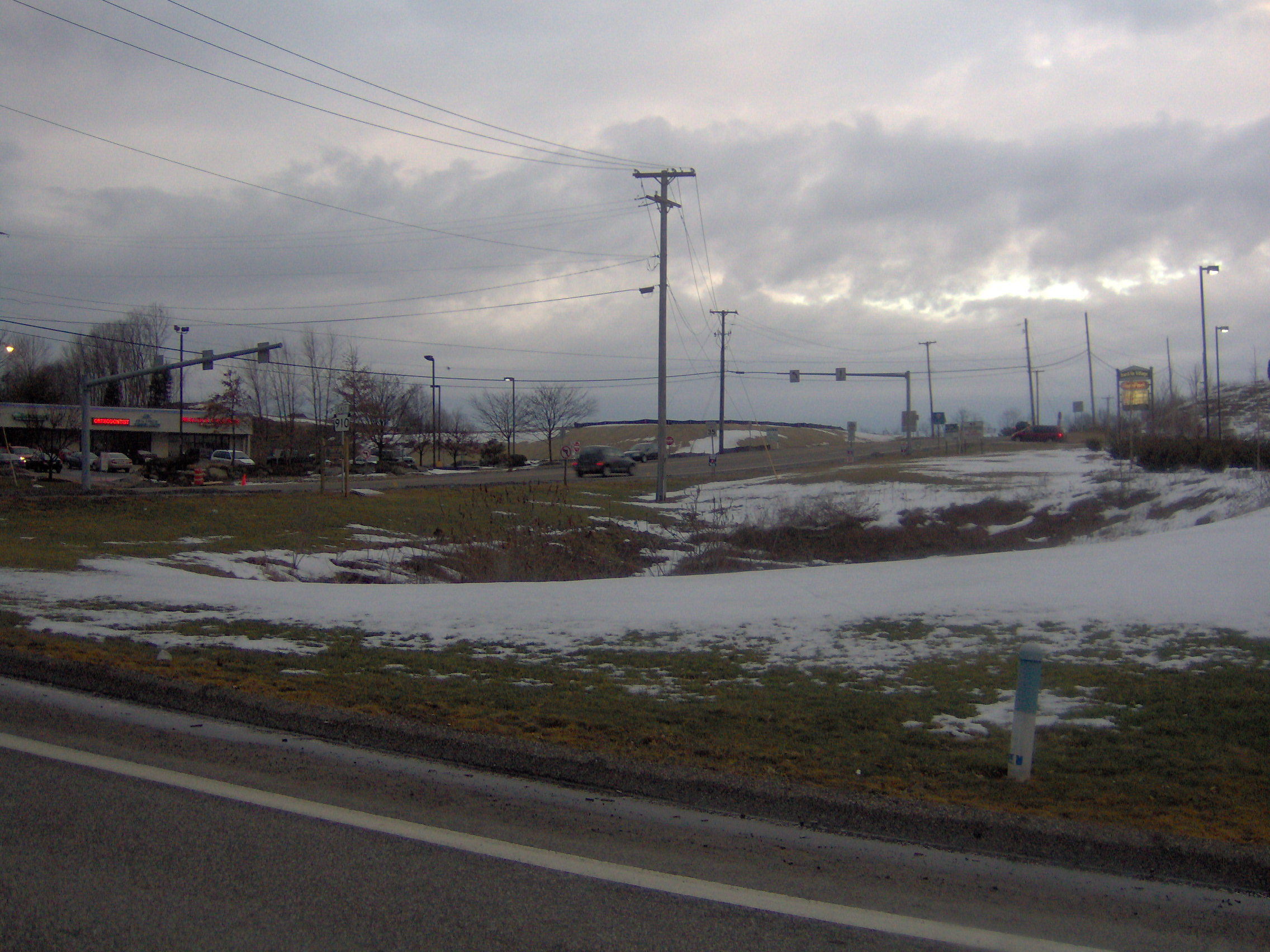
Pennsylvania Route 910 passes through part of Franklin Park.

Franklin Park is located at 40°35′26″N 80°5′31″W (40.590459, –80.092046).

According to the United States Census Bureau, the borough has a total area of 13.6 square miles (35 km^{2}), all land.

=== Surrounding neighborhoods ===
Franklin Park has eight borders, including Marshall Township to the north, Pine Township in the northeast corner, McCandless to the east, Ross Township to the southeast, Ohio Township to the south, Sewickley Hills to the west, Bell Acres from the west-northwest to northwest, and Economy in Beaver County in the northwest corner.

== Demographics ==
Historical population
Census	Pop.	Note	%±
1970	5,310		—
1980	6,135		15.5%
1990	10,109		64.8%
2000	11,364		12.4%
2010	13,470		18.5%
2020	15,479		14.9%

=== 2020 census ===
As of the 2020 census, Franklin Park had a population of 15,479. The median age was 41.8 years. 26.2% of residents were under the age of 18 and 15.8% of residents were 65 years of age or older. For every 100 females there were 98.0 males, and for every 100 females age 18 and over there were 94.4 males age 18 and over.

94.5% of residents lived in urban areas, while 5.5% lived in rural areas.

There were 5,376 households in Franklin Park, of which 41.9% had children under the age of 18 living in them. Of all households, 75.5% were married-couple households, 8.3% were households with a male householder and no spouse or partner present, and 13.3% were households with a female householder and no spouse or partner present. About 14.2% of all households were made up of individuals and 7.2% had someone living alone who was 65 years of age or older.

There were 5,556 housing units, of which 3.2% were vacant. The homeowner vacancy rate was 0.7% and the rental vacancy rate was 7.8%.

Racial composition as of the 2020 census
Race	Number	Percent
White	11,838	76.5%
Black or African American	187	1.2%
American Indian and Alaska Native	19	0.1%
Asian	2,622	16.9%
Native Hawaiian and Other Pacific Islander	11	0.1%
Some other race	115	0.7%
Two or more races	687	4.4%
Hispanic or Latino (of any race)	306	2.0%

=== 2000 census ===
As of the 2000 census, there were 11,364 people, 3,866 households, and 3,282 families residing in the borough. The population density was 836.5 inhabitants per square mile (323.0/km^{2}). There were 3,973 housing units at an average density of 292.5 per square mile (112.9/km^{2}).

The racial makeup of the borough was 95.05% White, 1.02% African American, 0.04% Native American, 2.89% Asian, 0.19% Pacific Islander, 0.17% from other races, and 0.64% from two or more races. Hispanic or Latino of any race were 0.54% of the population.

There were 3,866 households, out of which 45.2% had children under the age of 18 living with them, 78.0% were married couples living together, 4.9% had a female householder with no husband present, and 15.1% were non-families. 13.2% of all households were made up of individuals, and 5.3% had someone living alone who was 65 years of age or older. The average household size was 2.93 and the average family size was 3.23.

In the borough the population was spread out, with 30.8% under the age of 18, 4.5% from 18 to 24, 25.7% from 25 to 44, 29.6% from 45 to 64, and 9.4% who were 65 years of age or older. The median age was 40 years. For every 100 females there were 97.7 males. For every 100 females age 18 and over, there were 95.2 males.

=== Income and poverty ===
70% of adult residents had a bachelor's degree. The median income for a household in the borough was $121,661. The median income for a family was $94,521. Males had a median income of $77,517 versus $40,828 for females. The per capita income for the borough was $37,924. About 2.3% of families and 3.1% of the population were below the poverty line, including 4.2% of those under age 18 and 5.8% of those age 65 or over.

== Parks and recreation ==
Recreational areas of Franklin Park include:

- Acorn Park
- Blueberry Hill Park
- Linbrook Park
- Fifer's Fields Conservation Area
- Pennsylvania State Game Lands Number 203

== Government and politics ==
Franklin Park is governed by an elected six-member council, mayor, and a hired manager. Each of the borough's three wards elects two members to the council. The council elects a President, Vice-President, and Second Vice-President.

Each year, Council appoints a local high school student to serve as the Junior Councilperson.

- [2017-2019] Republicans-5 (Hogg, Coombs, Lawrence, Myslinski, Lawrence, Schwartzmier), Multiparty-1 (Parks), Democrats-0
- [2026] Democrats will hold all six borough council seats (Jiang Li, Uday Palled, Venu Paruvelli, Laura Czekaj, Brian Malkin, and J. Curtis Neil, II.

Presidential election results
Year	Republican	Democratic	Third parties
2024	46% 4,533	52% 5,057	2% 195
2020	47% 4,582	51% 5,036	1% 105
2016	52% 4,157	44% 3,567	4% 317
2012	63% 4,673	36% 2,716	1% 66

== Schools ==
Franklin Park is served by the North Allegheny School District, including North Allegheny Senior High School, along with the Town of McCandless, Marshall Township and the borough of Bradford Woods. It participates in the multi-municipality Northland Public Library.
