= PTC Alliance =

International corporation specializing in steel products

PTC Steel
- Type: Private
- Industry: steel
- Founded: 2010
- Headquarters: Wexford, Pennsylvania
- Website: https://ptcsteel.com

PTC Steel is an international corporation specializing in steel products. It is a leading worldwide manufacturer of Electric Resistance Welded (ERW) and Drawn Over Mandrel (DOM) mechanical steel tube. They also create shaped tube, chrome rod, and fabricated steel components. The corporation can trace its roots to the formation of Pittsburgh Tube in 1924. It is headquartered in the Pittsburgh suburb of Wexford, PA. PTC Steel has 13 manufacturing facilities in the U.S.A. PTC Steel has sales offices in the United States and the United Kingdom.

U.S. Manufacturing locations:

- Alliance, OH
- Beaver Falls, PA
- Bedford Park, IL
- Chicago Heights, IL
- Darlington, PA
- Hannibal, MO
- Fairbury, IL
- Liberty, TX
- Middletown, OH
- Minneapolis, MN
- Richmond, IN

PTC Steel is controlled by Black Diamond Capital Management, a private equity firm.
