= Bradford Woods, Pennsylvania =

Borough in Pennsylvania, US

- Borough
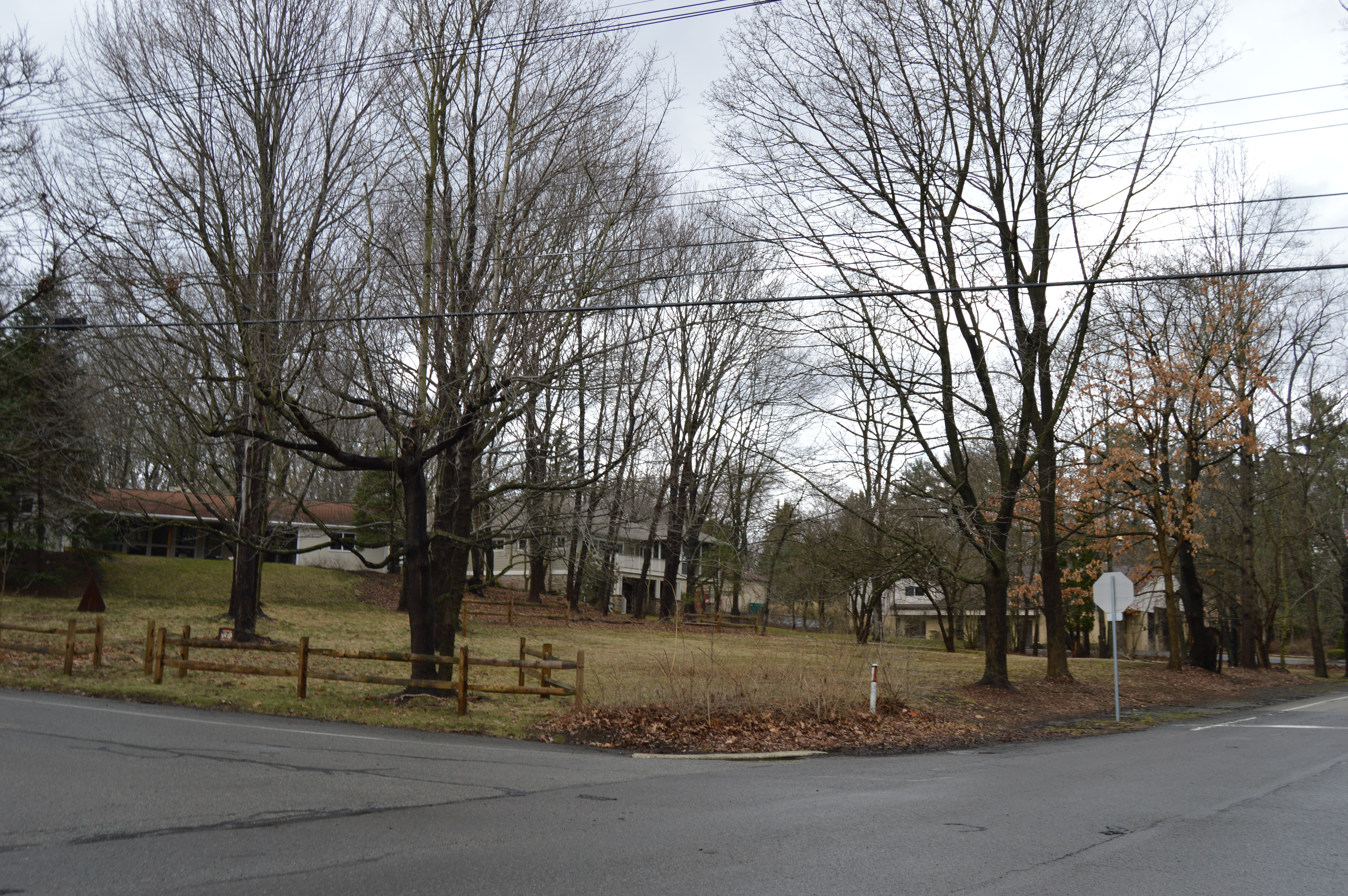
- Intersection at the center of the community

- Seal
- Etymology: Thomas Bradford
- Location in Allegheny County and the U.S. state of Pennsylvania.

- Location of Pennsylvania in the United States
- Coordinates: 40°39′09″N 80°04′55″W
- Country: United States
- State: Pennsylvania
- County: Allegheny
- Incorporated: May 3, 1915

Government
  - Mayor: Douglas Marsico (R)

Area
  - Total: 0.89 sq mi (2.31 km^{2})
  - Land: 0.89 sq mi (2.31 km^{2})
  - Water: 0 sq mi (0.00 km^{2})
- Elevation: 1,250 ft (380 m)

Population (2020)
  - Total: 1,183
  - Density: 1,327.2/sq mi (512.43/km^{2})
- Time zone: UTC-5 (EST)
  - Summer (DST): UTC-4 (EDT)
- ZIP code: 15015
- Area code: 724
- FIPS code: 42-08064
- School District: North Allegheny
- Website: www.bradfordwoodspa.org

Bradford Woods is a borough in Allegheny County, Pennsylvania, United States. The population was 1,183 at the 2020 census. A suburb of the Pittsburgh metropolitan area, it is part of the North Allegheny School District and participates in the multi-municipality Northland Public Library. It is home to Bradford Woods Elementary School.

== History ==
Bradford Woods, originally settled as a summer getaway, was incorporated as a borough on May 3, 1915, from Marshall Township. The Pittsburgh, Harmony, Butler and New Castle (Harmony Line) interurban railway previously ran through Bradford Woods, where Forest Road is today. It provided a direct route to Pittsburgh. A home rule government was established in 1974.

== Geography ==
Bradford Woods is located at 40°38′9″N 80°4′55″W.

According to the United States Census Bureau, the borough has a total area of 0.9 square miles (2.3 km^{2}), all of it land. Its average elevation is 1,250 ft (381 m) above sea level.

=== Surrounding neighborhoods ===
Bradford Woods has only two borders: Marshall Township to the north, south and west, and Pine Township to the east. The community is surrounded by unincorporated Wexford and has its own zip code.

== Demographics ==
Historical population
Census	Pop.	Note	%±
1920	213		—
1930	370		73.7%
1940	374		1.1%
1950	458		22.5%
1960	866		89.1%
1970	970		12.0%
1980	1,264		30.3%
1990	1,329		5.1%
2000	1,149		−13.5%
2010	1,171		1.9%
2020	1,183		1.0%

As of the census of 2000, there were 1,149 people, 464 households, and 373 families residing in the borough. The population density was 1,283.2 people per square mile (495.4 people/km^{2}). There were 478 housing units at an average density of 533.8 per square mile (206.1/km^{2}). The racial makeup of the borough was 98.61% White, 0.09% Native American, 0.87% Asian, 0.26% from other races, and 0.17% from two or more races. Hispanic or Latino of any race were 0.78% of the population.

There were 464 households, out of which 26.3% had children under the age of 18 living with them, 75.6% were married couples living together, 4.1% had a female householder with no husband present, and 19.4% were non-families. 17.5% of all households were made up of individuals, and 5.6% had someone living alone who was 65 years of age or older. The average household size was 2.48 and the average family size was 2.80.

In the borough the population was spread out, with 18.7% under the age of 18, 5.3% from 18 to 24, 21.1% from 25 to 44, 39.3% from 45 to 64, and 15.6% who were 65 years of age or older. The median age was 47 years. For every 100 females there were 97.8 males. For every 100 females age 18 and over, there were 95.4 males.

The median income for a household in the borough was $92,820, and the median income for a family was $100,329. Males had a median income of $70,313 versus $43,125 for females. The per capita income for the borough was $51,462. About 1.1% of families and 1.4% of the population were below the poverty line, including none of those under age 18 and 5.1% of those age 65 or over.

== Government and politics ==
The local government of Bradford Woods occupies offices in Fithian Hall (the fire hall). The current mayor is Doug Marsico.

Bradford Woods Borough is protected by Bradford Woods VFC Station 115. The chief is Ben Titus and the President is Michael Gillis.

Presidential Elections Results
Year	Republican	Democratic	Third Parties
2024	Lost	WON	Lost
2020	47% 410	50% 437	1% 9
2016	53% 425	42% 331	5% 40
2012	64% 503	36% 282	0% 5

== Notable people ==
- Christina Aguilera, Grammy award-winning singer, actress, and pop culture icon, grew up in Bradford Woods. In a 2002 episode of MTV Diary she returned to the area, and the owners of her former home on Bradford Road allowed her to tour her old house.
- Chris Hoke, former Pro Bowl lineman for the Pittsburgh Steelers
- Robert J. Kirkpatrick, aviator and award-winning airplane builder, who earned an Outstanding Workmanship award for his construction of Wittman Tailwind s/n 1101 at the 1965 EAA Convention in Rockford, Illinois. This aircraft is still actively flying today.
