= James Meeker =

American baseball player (born 1995)

Free agent
- Pitcher
- Born: March 22, 1995 (age 31); Livingston, New Jersey, U.S.
- Bats: Right Throws: Right

MLB debut
- June 7, 2024, for the Milwaukee Brewers

MLB statistics (through 2024 season)
- Win–loss record: 0–0
- Earned run average: 0.00
- Strikeouts: 0
- Stats at Baseball Reference

Teams
- Milwaukee Brewers (2024)

James Henry Meeker III (born March 22, 1995) is an American professional baseball pitcher who is a free agent. He has previously played in Major League Baseball (MLB) for the Milwaukee Brewers.

== Career ==
=== Amateur career ===
Meeker attended North Allegheny Senior High School in Wexford, Pennsylvania. He attended the University of Akron to play college baseball for the Akron Zips. When Akron ended their baseball program, he transferred to the University of Delaware to play for the Delaware Fightin' Blue Hens.

=== Washington Wild Things ===
Meeker was not selected in the 2018 MLB draft and signed with the Washington Wild Things of the Frontier League on June 20, 2018. He made 19 appearances on the year, recording a 3.94 ERA with 26 strikeouts across 29 2/3 innings pitched. In 2019, Meeker appeared in 40 games for Washington, compiling a 3.17 ERA with 57 strikeouts across 54 innings pitched.

In 2020, after the Frontier League season was cancelled due to the COVID-19 pandemic, Meeker played for the Steel City Slammin' Slammers of the Washington League. He made eight scoreless appearances for the club, striking out 12 across 7 2/3 innings.

Meeker returned to the Wild Things in 2021, making 30 appearances and remarkably tossing 31 2/3 scoreless innings with 43 strikeouts.

=== Milwaukee Brewers ===
On August 14, 2021, Meeker's contract was purchased by the Milwaukee Brewers organization. He finished the year with the Single–A Carolina Mudcats, posting an 0.50 ERA with 25 strikeouts and 5 saves in 12 appearances.

Meeker spent the 2022 campaign with the High–A Wisconsin Timber Rattlers, also making two scoreless appearances for the Double–A Biloxi Shuckers. In 42 games for Wisconsin, he registered a 2.45 ERA with 57 strikeouts and 17 saves across 62 1/3 innings of work. Meeker spent the majority of 2023 with Biloxi, also making two appearances for the Triple–A Nashville Sounds. In 34 games for Biloxi, he accumulated an 8–4 record and 3.13 ERA with 80 strikeouts across 89 innings pitched.

Meeker began 2024 with Biloxi, and was promoted to Nashville after four scoreless appearances. Pitching in 14 games for Nashville, he logged a 3.48 ERA with 20 strikeouts across 20 2/3 innings. On June 7, 2024, Meeker was selected to the 40-man roster and promoted to the major leagues for the first time. In his debut, he tossed a scoreless inning, allowing one hit and issuing one walk with no strikeouts. On June 11, Meeker was designated for assignment by the Brewers. He cleared waivers and was sent outright to Nashville on June 15. Meeker was released by the Brewers organization on October 8.

=== Staten Island FerryHawks ===
On April 15, 2025, Meeker signed with the Staten Island FerryHawks of the Atlantic League of Professional Baseball. In 33 games 36 innings of relief he went 1-2 with a 4.25 ERA with 48 strikeouts. He became a free agent following the season.
