= Alleghany High School =

Alleghany High School is the name of several schools in the United States:

- Alleghany High School (North Carolina)
- Alleghany High School (Virginia)

== See also ==
- Allegany High School
- Allegheny High School (disambiguation)
