= Pennsylvania State Game Lands Number 203 =

Park in the United States

- Location within Pennsylvania
- Location: Allegheny County, Pennsylvania
- Nearest city: Pittsburgh
- Coordinates: 40°37′34″N 80°7′1″W; 40°33′34″N 79°48′32″W
- Area: 1,245.8 acres (504.2 ha)
- Designation: Pennsylvania State Game Lands
- Owner: Pennsylvania Game Commission

The Pennsylvania State Game Lands Number 203 are Pennsylvania State Game Lands located in Allegheny County, Pennsylvania in the United States.

== Geography ==
The Game Lands consists of 1,245.8 acres (504.2 ha) in two parcels located approximately 20 miles (32 km) northwest of Pittsburgh. The larger parcel is located in Franklin Park and Marshall Township. The smaller parcel is located in Springdale Township. The western parcel falls within the East Branch Big Sewickley Creek watershed and Interstate 79 runs north/south approximately 0.5 miles (0.80 km) to the east. The eastern parcel falls within the Yutes Run watershed and Pennsylvania Route 28 passes just to the south. Both watersheds are part of the Ohio River basin. The Game Lands consists of steep hills elevations range from 910 feet (280 m) along the streams to 1,200 feet (370 m) on the hilltops.

== Statistics ==
The Pennsylvania State Game Lands Number 203 consists of 1,245.8 acres (504.2 ha) in two parcels. It was entered into the Geographic Names Information System on 1 April 1990 as identification number 1208078. Its elevation is listed as 1,138 feet (347 m).

== Amenities ==
SGL 203 features a practice pistol range and separate rifle range with 25, 50, and 100 yard targets. Both ranges feature handicap accessible parking and shooting tables.

== Biology ==
SGL 203 is 94% forested dominated by oak and Mesophytic and other eastern deciduous trees. Hunting includes White-tailed deer (Odocoileus virginianus), Common pheasant (Phasianus colchicus), Eastern cottontail rabbit (Sylvilagus floridanus), Eastern gray squirrel (Sciurus carolinensis). Fur game includes Coyote (Canis latrans), Gray fox (Urocyon cinereoargenteus), red fox (Vulpes Vulpes), American mink (Neovison vison), Muskrat (Ondatra zibethicus), and Raccoon (Procyon lotor).

== See also ==
- Pennsylvania State Game Lands
