= Brian Baschnagel =

American football player (born 1954)

No. 47, 84
- Position: Wide receiver

Personal information
- Born: January 8, 1954 (age 72); Kingston, New York, U.S.
- Listed height: 5 ft 11 in (1.80 m)
- Listed weight: 187 lb (85 kg)

Career information
- High school: North Allegheny (Wexford, Pennsylvania)
- College: Ohio State
- NFL draft: 1976: 3rd round, 66th overall pick

Career history
- Chicago Bears (1976–1985)

Awards and highlights
- Super Bowl champion (XX); 2× Second-team All-Big Ten (1973, 1974); West Pennsylvania Sports Hall of Fame (2013)

Career NFL statistics
- Receptions: 134
- Receiving yards: 2,024
- Touchdowns: 9
- Stats at Pro Football Reference

Brian Dale Baschnagel (born January 8, 1954) is an American former professional football player who was a wide receiver for the Chicago Bears of the National Football League (NFL). He played college football for the Ohio State Buckeyes and was selected by the Bears in the third round of the 1976 NFL draft.

== College career ==
Baschnagel was a four-year starting wide receiver at Ohio State where his teams had a 40–5–1 record, won four Big Ten titles, and had four Rose Bowl appearances. He led the Buckeyes in receiving yards in 1974 (362) and 1975 (244). He was a co-captain of the 1975 team. He was part of the famed Ohio State teams that included Pete Johnson, Cornelius Greene, and John Hicks who helped Archie Griffin to win two Heisman Trophy awards. He was a two-time Academic All-American and Academic All-Big Ten selection. Baschnagel finished his career with 86 carries for 652 yards and six touchdowns along with 56 receptions for 794 yards and four touchdowns.

== Professional career ==
Baschnagel was selected by the Chicago Bears in the third round of the 1976 NFL draft. He wore jersey #47 in his rookie year, which he began as a defensive back, and #84 the remainder of his career with the Bears after moving back to receiver. Contrary to popular belief, Baschnagel was not on the active roster in 1985 when the Bears went 18–1 en route to a Super Bowl victory. He injured his knee in training camp and spent the entire 1985 season on IR. However, he did travel with the team that year, assisted the coaches from the coaching booth, and helped in practice after he recovered from his injury. He received a Super Bowl ring after the Bears' dominant Super Bowl XX win.

== Personal life ==
After retiring from the NFL, he worked for North American Corporation and retired as the vice president of corporate sales in 2012. Baschnagel has a wife, Mindy, two daughters, Mallory and Allie, and a son, Luke.

In 2013, it was announced that Baschnagel would be inducted into the West Pennsylvania Sports Hall of Fame.
