= Chris Devlin =

American football player (born 1953)

No. 50, 51
- Position: Linebacker

Personal information
- Born: November 22, 1953 (age 72); Wexford, Pennsylvania, U.S.

Career information
- High school: North Allegheny
- College: Penn State
- NFL draft: 1975: 7th round, 170th overall pick

Career history
- Cincinnati Bengals (1975–1978); Chicago Bears (1978)

Career NFL statistics
- Games played-started: 30-2
- Stats at Pro Football Reference

Christopher James Devlin (born November 22, 1953) is an American former professional football player and dentist. He played linebacker for four seasons in the National Football League (NFL) for the Cincinnati Bengals and the Chicago Bears. Devlin played at the collegiate level at Penn State University.
