= Books for Keeps =

British online magazine

Books for Keeps is a British online magazine covering children's literature. The magazine launched in 1980 and includes books reviews, author interviews, and articles. The Books for Keeps website says it includes more than 12,500 reviews and more than 2,000 articles and interviews and quotes Philip Pullman as saying it is "the most important periodical in the world of British children's books". The headquarters of the magazine is in Wood Green.

Brian Alderson, founder of the Children's Books History Society and former Children's Book Editor for The Times, writes a "Classics in Short" section in the magazine's back pages.

== Books ==
Books for Keeps also publishes various books:

- The Books for Keeps Guide to Children's Books for a Multi-cultural Society: Level 0–7, by Pat Triggs, Books for Keeps, 1986 - Children of minorities - 64 pages
- The Books for Keeps Guide to Poetry 0–16, Books for Keeps, P. Triggs (1988)

== See also ==
- School Library Journal
