= North Allegheny Intermediate High School =

High school in McCandless, Pennsylvania

Coordinates: 40.570728°N 80.031514°W

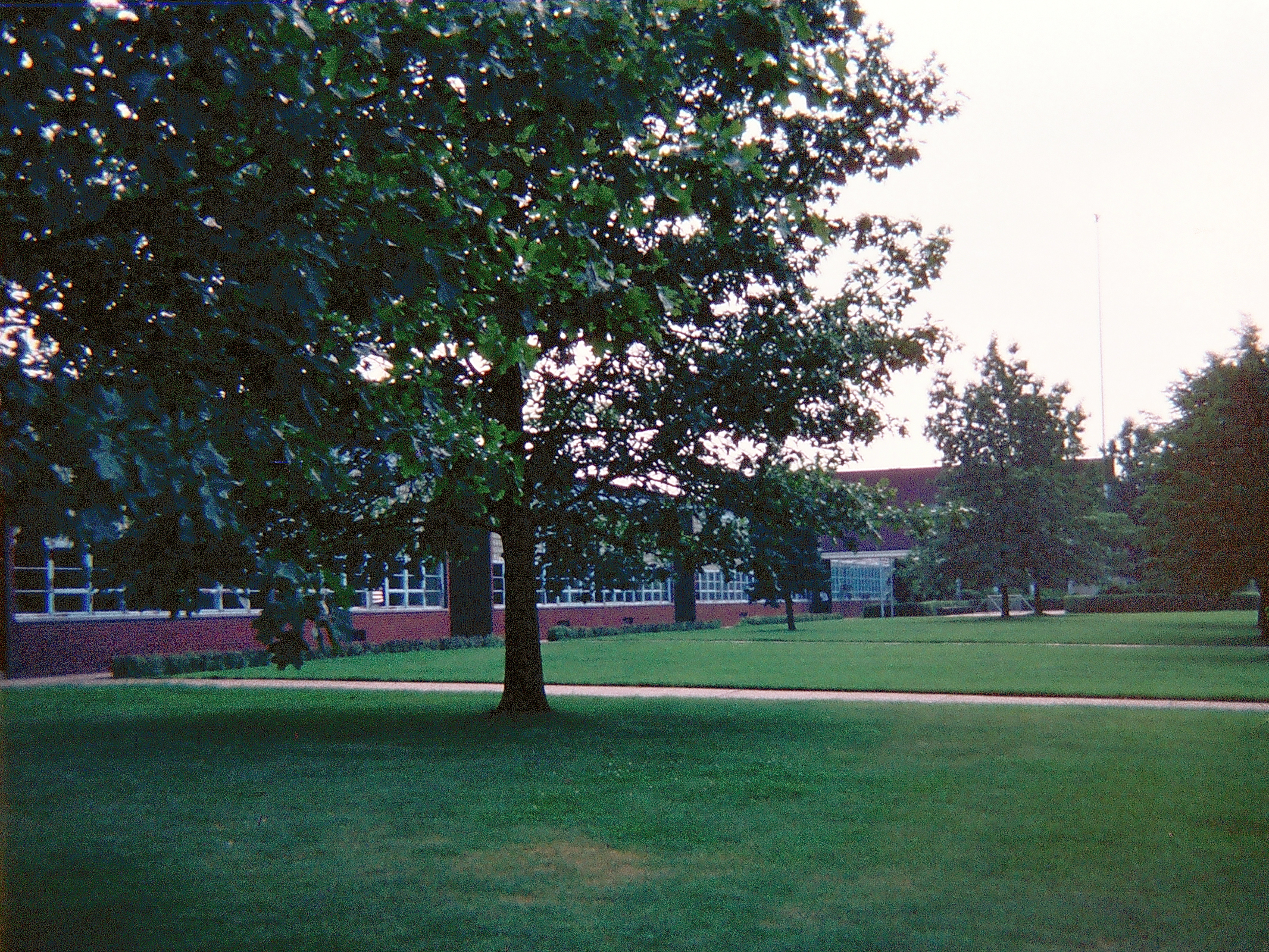
- 350 Cumberland Road; Pittsburgh, PA 15237; United States

Information
- Other name: NAI
- Type: Public
- Motto: "Great Expectations...The Best Is Yet To Come"
- Established: 1954 (building-as Junior/Senior High), 1974 (as NAI)
- School district: North Allegheny School District
- Faculty: 93
- Grades: 9–10
- Enrollment: 1,298 (2011)
- Colors: Black and Gold
- Athletics: WPIAL (AAAA),
- Mascot: Tiger
- Website: North Allegheny Intermediate High School

School District region in Allegheny County

North Allegheny Intermediate High School (NAI) is a suburban high school in the North Allegheny School District located in McCandless, Pennsylvania, a community north of Pittsburgh. It is one of two high schools in the district and serves grades 9 and 10. According to the National Center for Education Statistics, in 2011, the North Allegheny Intermediate High School reported an enrollment of 1,298 pupils in grades 9th and 10th. The school employed 93 teachers, yielding a student-teacher ratio of 13:1.

In 2007, the ethnic breakdown among the school population was 91.4% Caucasian, 6.3% Asian/Pacific Islander, 1.5% African American, and 0.7% Hispanic.

The school opened in 1954 as the North Allegheny Junior-Senior High School with 33 classrooms for grades 7-12. The design of the building was award-winning in its time, with distinct features include six letter-coded sloping hallways (or ramps) and most classrooms divided by outdoor courtyard spaces (unusual in school design for the time period). The building was expanded further in 1957 and 1963, adding classrooms in the rear of the building. The building became North Allegheny Senior High School (NASH) for grades 11-12 in 1969 upon the opening of Thomas E. Carson Intermediate High School (now Carson Middle School). The building assumed its current role as the Intermediate High School for grades 9-10 in 1974, when the new and current Senior High School in Wexford opened. A major renovation in 1997 expanded the building through the addition of the lower gym, larger cafeteria, and new front wing addition. The most recent renovation to the facility was completed in 2017.

== Extracurriculars ==
The North Allegheny School District offers a wide variety of clubs, activities and an extensive sports program.

=== Clubs & activities ===
NAI has a wide array of extracurricular clubs and activities available to students, including a Student Council, AFJROTC, Key Club, and Junior Classical League.

=== Music ===
NAI offers several music courses and activities, such as wind bands, string orchestras, choirs, and music theory and composition electives. Additionally, NAI students have the opportunity to participate in extracurricular music activities. Some examples are marching band, Strolling Strings, NA Symphony Orchestra, and orchestra pit for the musical.

=== Athletics ===
Students can participate in athletics at the Freshman and Junior Varsity levels in a wide variety of sports under WPIAL rules. The athletic program began in 1969 and has won a number of state championships. However, athletics are mainly found at North Allegheny Senior High School, the main North Allegheny high school serving grades 11–12 which houses all varsity sports.

The district funds:

Boys

- Baseball
- Basketball
- Bowling
- Cross Country
- Football
- Golf
- Indoor Track and Field
- Lacrosse
- Soccer
- Swimming and Diving
- Tennis
- Track and Field
- Volleyball
- Water Polo
- Wrestling

Girls

- Basketball
- Bowling
- Cheer
- Cross Country
- Field Hockey
- Golf
- Gymnastics
- Indoor Track and Field
- Lacrosse
- Soccer (Fall)
- Softball
- Swimming and Diving
- Girls' Tennis
- Track and Field
- Volleyball
- Water Polo

According to PIAA directory July 2013

== Notable alumni ==
- Christina Aguilera – Grammy-winning artist; through 9th grade
- Mike McMahon – professional football player
