= Northland Public Library =

Coordinates: 40.57098°N 80.03463°W

Northland Public Library is a public library serving a north suburban area of Allegheny County, Pennsylvania. Located in McCandless Township about eight miles north of downtown Pittsburgh, Pennsylvania, it is operated as a municipal authority supported by the residents of McCandless, Ross Township, the Borough of Franklin Park, Marshall Township, and the Borough of Bradford Woods. It is one of the largest suburban public libraries in Pennsylvania with over 38,000 cardholders and well over 1.1 million items circulated in 2012. The library is a member of the Allegheny County Library Association.

== See also ==
- Pennsylvania Library Association
