= Leif Bergdahl =

Swedish physician and politician (born 1941)

Leif Bergdahl (born 1941) is a Swedish physician and former member of the now defunct right-wing political party New Democracy. He served at the Riksdag, Swedish Parliament.

== Biography ==
Bergdahl was born in 1941. He has a degree in medicine and was promoted to the title of associate professor in medicine. He is a heart disease specialist and worked in Alabama, USA, for one year. He was a member of the New Democracy and was elected to the Riksdag in the 1991 general election. He served at the Riksdag between September 1991 and October 1994. During his term he was part of the special pension working group.

He was one of the shareholders of the mining company Northland which went bankrupt in 2015.
