= Stefaan Verhulst =

Stefaan G. Verhulst
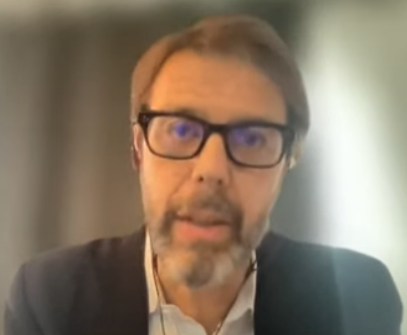
- Speaking at the World Economic Forum's Sustainable Development Impact Summit 2021
- Born: 1966 (age 59–60)
- Occupation: Academic
- Employers: The Governance Lab; New York University; Markle Foundation; Oxford University; Annenberg School for Communication at the University of Pennsylvania; Central European University; Yale Law School

Stefaan G. Verhulst (born 1966) is the co-founder and chief research and development officer of The Governance Laboratory (The GovLab) at New York University. His research and writing considers how advances in technology and science can be harnessed to create effective and collaborative forms of governance.

== Career ==
Prior to joining the Markle Foundation in 2001, Verhulst held several senior research positions in Belgium and the UK, including the University of Glasgow and Oxford University. He co-founded the Programme in Comparative Media Law and Policy at Oxford University with Monroe Price. At Oxford, he was also the UNESCO Chairholder in Communications Law and Policy for the UK and the Socio-Legal research Fellow at Wolfson College. He has spoken at TedXMidAtlantic's New Rules seminar.

In addition to GovLab, he holds several other academic and professional positions including senior advisor to the Markle Foundation, a private non-profit organization committed to promoting the development of communications industries that address public needs; where he was Chief of Research for 11 years; advisor to Global Partners Digital; Expert on the Influencer Advisory Board of sparks & honey; and board member for Obricom-UNESCO. He has also been senior research fellow at the Center for Global Communication Studies at the University of Pennsylvania; and the Center for Media and Communications Studies, Central European University in Budapest, a senior associated fellow in the Programme in Comparative Media Law and Policy at Oxford University, which he co-founded several years ago; and International Fellow of the Information Society Project at Yale Law School; and a fellow for the Center for Democracy and Technology. He was also Adjunct Professor in the Department of Media, Culture, and Communication at New York University.

Verhulst has served as consultant to various international and national organizations, including 10 Downing Street, Aspen Institute, Bertelsmann Foundation, Broadcasting Standards Commission (London), Council of Europe, Digital Video Broadcasting Group (Geneva), European Commission, European Research Institute of the Consumer Organizations (ERICA - London), Government of the United Kingdom's Department for International Development (DFID), House of Commons, Organization for Security and Co-operation in Europe (OSCE), Paul, Weiss, Rifkind, Wharton & Garrison (Washington DC), UNESCO – Africa, United States Agency for International Development (USAID) and World Bank.

== Selected publications ==
Verhulst is the author and co-editor of several publications, including the following books, reports and chapters listed below. He is also the founder and editor-in-chief of the International Journal of Communications Law and Policy, and the Communications Law in Transition Newsletter and is a member of several editorial boards.

Books

- Goldberg, D.; Prosser, T.; Verhulst, S., eds. (1998). Legal Responses to the Changing Media. OUP. ISBN 9780198267812.
- Price, M.; Verhulst, S., eds. (1998). Broadcasting Reform in India. Law in India. Oxford University Press. ISBN 0195645642.
- Marsden, C.; Verhulst, S. (1999). Convergence in European Digital TV Regulation. Blackstone. ISBN 1854319906.
- Tambini, D.; Forgan, L.; Hall, C.; Verhulst, S., eds. (2001). Communications Revolution and Reform. IPPR. ISBN 9781860301384.
- Price, M.; Rozumilowicz, B.; Verhulst, S., eds. (2001). Media Reform: Democratizing the media, democratizing the state. London: Routledge. ISBN 9781138980730.
- Price, M.; Verhulst, S. (2002). Parental Control of Television Broadcasting. New York City: Routledge. ISBN 9781410605566.
- Price, M.; Verhulst, S. (2005). Self-regulation and the Internet. Kluwer. ISBN 9789041123060.
- Verhulst, S.; Price, M.; Morgan, L., eds. (2013). Handbook of Media Law and Policy – A SocioLegal Exploration. Routledge. ISBN 9781138858886.
- Price, M.; Puppis, M.; Verhulst, S. (2013). "Media Policy and Governance". Oxford Bibliographies in Communication. doi:10.1093/OBO/9780199756841-0119.
- Young, A.; Verhulst, S. (2016). The Global Impact of Open Data. O'Reilly. ISBN 9781492042785.

Articles

- Goldberg, D.; Verhulst, S. (1998). "European Media Policy: Complexity and Comprehensiveness". In d'Haenens, L.; Saeys, F. (eds.). Media Dynamics and Regulatory Concerns in the Digital Age. Quintessenz-Verlag. pp. 17–49. ISBN 9783876526980.
- Price, M.; Verhulst, S. (2000). "The Concept of Self-Regulation and the Internet". In Waltermann, Jens; Machill, Marcel (eds.). Protecting our children on the Internet: Towards a new culture of responsibility. Gütersloh: Bertelsmann Foundation Publishers. pp. 133–198. ISBN 3-89204-474-0.
- Holznagel, B.; Verhulst, S.; Grünwald, A.; Hahne, K. (2000). "Verhinderung des Digital Divide als Zukunftsaufgabe. Ein Plädoyer gegen die Errichtung von E-Barriers". Kommunikation & Recht: 425–431.
- Price, M.; Verhulst, S. (2000). "In search of the self: charting the course of self-regulation on the Internet in a global environment". In Marsden, C. (ed.). Regulating the Global Information Society. Routledge. pp. 57–78. ISBN 9780415242172.
- Livingstone, S.; Lievrouw, L., eds. (2001). "About Scarcities and Intermediaries: The Regulatory Paradigm Shift of Digital Content Reviewed". Handbook of New Media. Sage. doi:10.4135/9781848608245.n31.
- Verhulst, S.; Sandvig, C. (2004). "Internet and public policy in comparative perspective". In Price, M.; Nissenbaum, H. (eds.). Academy and the Internet. New York: Peter Lang. pp. 308–332. ISBN 9780820462035.
- Lievrouw, L.; Livingstone, S., eds. (2005). "16. The Regulation of Digital Content". Handbook of New Media: Social Shaping and Social Consequences of ICTs (Student ed.). Sage. pp. 329–349. doi:10.4135/9781446211304.n18.
- Napoli, P., ed. (2006). "Mediation, Mediators, and New Intermediaries". Media Diversity and Localism: Meaning and Metrics. Laurence Erlbaum. ISBN 9780805855487.
- Turow, J.; Tsui, L., eds. (2008). "Linked Geographies: Maps as Mediators of Reality". The Hyperlinked Society. Questioning Connections in The Digital Age. Ann Arbor: University of Michigan Press. pp. 191–205. ISBN 9780472070435.
- Verhulst, S.; Price, M. (2009). "Comparative Media Law and Policy: Opportunities and Challenges". In Thussu, D. (ed.). Internationalizing Media Studies: Impediments and Imperatives,. London: Routledge. ISBN 9780203877388.
- Mapping Digital Media: Net Neutrality and the Media (PDF) (Report). Reference Series. London: Open Society Foundations. 2011.
