= Thomas Keiser =

American football player (born 1989)

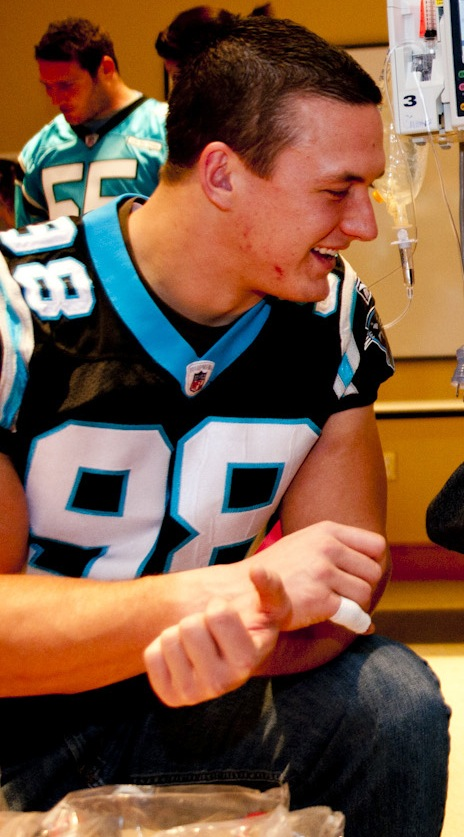
- Keiser with the Carolina Panthers

No. 98, 90, 53
- Position: Outside Linebacker

Personal information
- Born: March 28, 1989 (age 37); Hollidaysburg, Pennsylvania, U.S.
- Listed height: 6 ft 4 in (1.93 m)
- Listed weight: 260 lb (118 kg)

Career information
- High school: Wexford (PA) North Allegheny
- College: Stanford
- NFL draft: 2011: undrafted

Career history
- Carolina Panthers (2011–2012); San Diego Chargers (2013); Arizona Cardinals (2014); San Jose SaberCats (2015)*
- * Offseason or practice squad member only

Career NFL statistics
- Total tackles: 41
- Sacks: 9
- Pass deflections: 4
- Interceptions: 2
- Stats at Pro Football Reference

Thomas Keiser (born March 28, 1989) is an American former professional football player who was an outside linebacker in the National Football League (NFL). Keiser played college football for the Stanford Cardinal.

== Early life ==
Keiser attended high school at North Allegheny Senior High School and played for the Tigers before graduating in 2007.

== College career ==
Keiser played college football at Stanford University. He entered the 2011 NFL draft after his junior season.

== Professional career ==
=== Carolina Panthers ===
Keiser was signed by the Carolina Panthers as an undrafted free agent on July 30, 2011. He was waived on September 4, 2011, but was re-signed to the Panthers’ practice squad on September 6, 2011. Keiser was signed to the active roster on November 8, 2011. He was waived by the Panthers on May 13, 2013.

=== San Diego Chargers ===
Keiser signed with the San Diego Chargers on May 17, 2013. He was released on August 31, 2013, but was signed to the Chargers' practice squad on September 1, 2013. Keiser was signed to the active roster on October 1, 2013. Keiser proved to be a physical linebacker, playing 12 games, while starting 3, collecting 21 tackles, 4.5 sacks, and an interception. Keiser intercepted Peyton Manning in week 15 to seal the game and win for the chargers. He was released on August 30, 2014.

=== Arizona Cardinals ===
Keiser was claimed off waivers by the Arizona Cardinals on August 31, 2014. He was released on November 14, 2014.

=== San Jose SaberCats ===
Keiser was assigned to the San Jose SaberCats of the Arena Football League (AFL) on December 3, 2014. He was placed on reassignment on March 27, 2015.

== Personal life ==
Keiser is married to Heimana Vaea-Maafu-Moimoi Keiser.
