= Johan Bergdahl =

Swedish fencer

Personal information
- Full name: Johan Bergdahl
- Born: 29 September 1962 (age 63) Jönköping, Sweden

Sport
- Country: Sweden
- Sport: Fencing

Johan Bergdahl (born 29 September 1962) is a Swedish fencer. He competed in the team épée event at the 1988 Summer Olympics.
