= North Allegheny Senior High School =

Public secondary school in Wexford, Pennsylvania, United States

Location
- 10375 Perry Highway; Wexford, PA; Allegheny County; United States; 40.603506°N 80.053611°W

Information
- Type: Public
- School district: North Allegheny School District
- NCES School ID: 421701007482
- Principal: Matthew Buchak
- Faculty: 187.3 FTEs
- Grades: 11–12
- Enrollment: 2,697 (as of 2023–24)
- Student to teacher ratio: 14.4:1
- Colors: Black and Gold
- Athletics: WPIAL PIAA
- Mascot: Tiger
- Website: nash.northallegheny.org

School District region in Allegheny County

North Allegheny Senior High School (NASH) is a suburban high school in the North Allegheny School District and is located in Wexford, Pennsylvania, a northern suburb of Pittsburgh, Pennsylvania. The current building was built in 1974. The feeder school is North Allegheny Intermediate High School which provides grades 9th and 10th.

As of the 2023–24 school year, the school had an enrollment of 2,697 students and 187.3 classroom teachers (on an FTE basis) in grades 9–12, for a student–teacher ratio of 14.4:1. There were 270 students (10.0% of enrollment) eligible for free lunch and 13 (0.5% of students) eligible for reduced-cost lunch. In 2013, enrollment was 1,277 pupils in grades 11th and 12th, with 3% of pupils from a low income home. In 2013, North Allegheny Senior High School employed 98 teachers.

Former principal Lawrence Butterini was recognized by the Pennsylvania Association of Elementary and Secondary School Principals as the Pennsylvania High School Principal of the Year in 2006. Butterini was NASH principal and a figurehead of the school until his retirement following the 2009–2010 school year.

North Allegheny Senior High school students may choose to attend A W Beattie Career Center for training in the trades. The Allegheny Intermediate Unit IU3 provides the school with a wide variety of services like specialized education for disabled students and hearing, speech and visual disability services and professional development for staff and faculty.

== Extracurriculars ==
The district offers a variety of clubs, activities and a large sports program. North Allegheny Senior High School won the MSA Cup, a local scholastic trophy similar to the Director's Cup, every year the honor has been awarded. It is also home to Air Force Junior Reserve Officer Training Corps unit PA-022.

In December 2010 and 2012 the football team won PIAA and WPIAL Class AAAA football state titles, claiming the state in two out of three years.

== Athletics ==
Number of Team State Championships

- (16) Cross Country (Men's)- 1960 (AAA), 1961 (AAA), 1962 (AAA), 1965 (AAA), 1968 (AAA), 1970 (AAA), 1971 (AAA), 1974 (AAA), 1980 (AAA), 1997 (AAA), 2010 (AAA), 2014 (AAA), 2018 (AAA), 2020 (AAA), 2021 (AAA), 2022 (AAA)
- (11) Volleyball (Men's) - 1979, 1987, 1991, 1999, 2013 (AAA), 2018 (AAA), 2019 (AAA), 2020 (AAA), 2021 (AAA), 2022 (AAA), 2026 (AAA)
- (11) Volleyball (Women's) - 1992 (AAA), 1993 (AAA), 1994 (AAA), 2017 (AAAA), 2018 (AAAA), 2019 (AAAA), 2020 (AAAA), 2021 (AAAA), 2022 (AAAA), 2023 (AAAA), 2024 (AAAA)
- (9) Cross Country (Women's)- 1975 (AAA), 1998 (AAA), 1999 (AAA), 2018 (AAA), 2019 (AAA), 2020 (AAA), 2021 (AAA), 2022 (AAA), 2023 (AAA)
- (9) Swimming and Diving (Women's) - 1984, 1991, 1992, 1995 (AAA), 1996 (AAA), 1997 (AAA), 2021 (AAA), 2023 (AAA), 2024 (AAA)
- (8) Swimming and Diving (Men's) - 1994 (AAA), 2009 (AAA), 2010 (AAA), 2017 (AAA), 2018 (AAA), 2019 (AAA), 2025 (AAA), 2026 (AAA)
- (4) Tennis (Women's) - 2008 (AAA), 2013 (AAA), 2014 (AAA), 2015 (AAA)
- (4) Wrestling - 1987 (AAA), 1988 (AAA), 1989 (AAA), 1990 (AAA)
- (3) Football - 1990 (AAAA), 2010 (AAAA), 2012 (AAAA)
- (2) Baseball - 1996 (AAA), 2000 (AAA)
- (2) Ice Hockey - 2007 (AAA), 2013 (AAA)
- (2) Tennis (Men's) - 2005 (AAA), 2009 (AAA)
- (1) Golf (Women's) - 2015 (AAA)
- (1) Soccer (Men's) - 2000 (AAA)

The district funds

Varsity

Boys

- Baseball - AAAA
- Basketball- AAAA
- Bowling - AAAA
- Cross Country - AAA
- Football - AAAA
- Golf - AAA
- Indoor Track and Field - AAAA
- Lacrosse - AAAA
- Soccer - AAAA
- Swimming and Diving - AAA
- Tennis - AAA
- Track and Field - AAA
- Volleyball - AAA
- Water Polo - AAAA
- Wrestling - AAA

Girls

- Basketball - AAAA
- Bowling - AAAA
- Cheer - AAAA
- Cross Country - AAA
- Field Hockey - AAA
- Golf - AAA
- Gymnastics - AAAA
- Indoor Track and Field - AAAA
- Lacrosse - AAAA
- Soccer (Fall) - AAAA
- Softball - AAAA
- Swimming and Diving - AAA
- Girls' Tennis - AAA
- Track and Field - AAA
- Volleyball - AAA
- Water Polo - AAAA

== Newman Stadium and Baierl Center ==
NASH is a center for North Allegheny Athletics. It is located next to Carl A. Newman Stadium, which houses numerous sports. Newman Stadium was named after Carl A. Newman, a former North Allegheny superintendent and the main contributor to the stadium. The North Allegheny Varsity Football team plays all home games there during the fall sports season.

Next to Newman Stadium is the Baierl Center, a fitness center for North Allegheny Athletics. There are two gyms for cheerleading and practice squads and one large track on the upper level which is left for baseball, softball, and the rowing team. The Baierl Center also includes a weight room, an activity room, an exercise center. It is open free of charge to North Allegheny Athletics and also is available to district residents for a membership fee. The center is a 48,000-square-foot (4,500 m^{2}) building that was available for public use since 2002 and expanded in 2004, opening a room solely for indoor biking.

== Notable alumni ==
- Christina Aguilera, singer
- Brian Baschnagel, former football player
- Michael Bergdahl, business speaker and author
- James Davy (born 1953), former New Jersey Commissioner of Human Services under Governors James McGreevey and Jon Corzine
- Chris Devlin, former NFL player
- Khalil Dinkins, NFL tight end for the San Francisco 49ers
- Gregg Garrity, former NFL player
- Melissa Hart, former US representative
- Jake Herbert, two-time NCAA wrestling champion for Northwestern University, World Championships silver medalist in freestyle wrestling
- Warren Hoburg, NASA astronaut
- Jessica Jackley, entrepreneur and co-founder of Kiva
- Carl James, Forbes Magazine Chewer of the Year 2023
- Thomas Keiser, football player
- Jason Lammers, Head Coach Niagara University NCAA Hockey
- Don Lancaster, author, inventor, and microcomputer pioneer
- Mack Leftwich, Offensive Coordinator for Texas State
- Tim Manoa, former professional football player
- Griffin Matthews, actor, writer, director
- Brett McCutcheon, musician, producer, music educator
- Mike McMahon, former NFL player
- James Meeker, professional baseball player
- Teague Moore, NCAA wrestling champion at Oklahoma State, gold medalist at University World Championships in freestyle wrestling
- Frank Nicotero, comedian
- Mark Nordenberg, chancellor of the University of Pittsburgh
- Ayden Owens-Delerme, Decathlete
- Joey Porter Jr. - NFL football player for the Dallas Cowboys
- Richard Rossi (1981) writer-director
- Sarah Schupansky, soccer player
- Cory Sullivan, MLB player
- Dan Smyers, Singer, Transition, Dan + Shay
- Cole Young, baseball player
- Chelsea Zhang, actress
