= Brian Alderson (critic) =

British writer (born 1930)

Brian Alderson (born 1930) is an author, translator, critic, and children's book historian. He has translated fairy tales, is a contributor to Books for Keeps and was children's literature editor for The Times. He founded the Children's Books History Society.

== Career ==
Brian began as a specialist bookseller in 1950. He lectured on children's literature at the University of North London for twenty years before becoming books editor for The Times from 1967 until 1995. He has organized exhibitions and written extensively on children's book history and illustration. He was president of the Beatrix Potter Society. He received the Eleanor Farjeon Award and received an honorary doctorate from the University of Surrey.

== Bibliography ==
- Brian Alderson, "Edward Ardizzone: a preliminary hand-list of his illustrated books, 1929–1970". The Private Library, 2nd series, 5:1 (1972 Spring), pp. 2–64.
- Brian Alderson, Edward Ardizzone: A Bibliographic Commentary. Pinner: Private Libraries Association, 2003. ISBN 978-0-900002-47-2.
- Brian Alderson, "Miniature libraries for the young". The Private Library, 3rd series, 6 (1983), 3–38.
- Brian Alderson and Felix de Marez Oyens, Be merry and wise: origins of children's book publishing in England 1650–1850. New York: The Pierpont Morgan Library, 2006. ISBN 9781584561804.
- F. J. Harvey Darton, Children's Books in England. 3rd ed. Revised by Brian Alderson. Cambridge: Cambridge University Press, 1982. ISBN 0521240204.
- Brian Alderson, "Tracts, Reward and Fairies: the Victorian contribution to children's literature". In: Essays in the History of Publishing..., ed. Asa Briggs, London: Longman, 1974.
- Cakes and Custard: children's rhymes selected by Brian Alderson and illustrated by Helen Oxenbury. London: Heinemann, 1975. ISBN 0434926000.
- Brian Alderson, Ezra Jack Keats: a bibliography and catalogue. Gretna, LA: Pelican Publishing Company, University of Southern Mississippi, 2002. ISBN 1-56554-007-7.
- Brian Alderson, Ezra Jack Keats: Artist and Picture-Book Maker, Gretna, LA: Pelican Publishing Company, 1994. ISBN 1-56554-006-9.
- Brian Alderson, "The History of Aesop's Fables". Books for Keeps 165 (July 2007).
- Brian Alderson, "Fairy Tales in the New Millennium". Books For Keeps 131 (November 2001).
- Lorraine Johnson and Brian Alderson, The Ladybird Story: children's books for everyone. London: British Library, 2014. ISBN 0-7123-5728-9.
