= Robert J. Kirkpatrick =

British writer and researcher

- Born: November 2, 1953 (age 72); Stourbridge, Worcestershire, England
- Occupations: Researcher and writer
- Years active: 1990–
- Known for: Writing on Boy's Fiction
- Notable work: From the Penny Dreadful to the Ha'penny Dreadfuller

Robert J Kirkpatrick is a researcher and writer on boys' fiction.

He was born in Stourbridge, on 2 November 1953 and attended grammar school in Lichfield, Staffordshire. He worked as a benefit officer for the Notting Hill Housing Trust from 1990, and wrote some best practice guides for Housing Associations.

Kirkpatrick has written extensively on boy's fiction and is the Secretary of the Children's Books History Society, the British branch of the Friends of the Osborne and Lillian H. Smith Collections of children's books at the Toronto Public Library. He has written several short monographs for the society.

One recent work, Henty Goes to School: School Life in the Novels of G.A. Henty Kirkpatrick introduced the topic in the context of Henty's own schooling and then interposed passages about school life from Henty's books with commentary. G. A. Henty never wrote a full book set in a school setting.

Kirkpatrick's most recent work has concentrated on illustrations and he has produced two books on illustrations. He has contributed a whole series of thorough and detailed biographies of illustrators of children's books on the Bear Alley blog.

== Works ==
Publications by Robert J. Kirkpatrick (BL refers to British Library)
No	Year	Title	Other Author/s	Pages	Publisher	ISBN	BL	Source of data, if other than BL
1	1990	Bullies, Beaks and Flannelled Fools: An Annotated Bibliography of Boys' School Fiction, 1742–1990		120	Author, London	0951637304	Yes	
2	1999	Housing Benefit: A Good Practice Guide for Housing Associations			National Housing Federation, London		No	Encyclopedia.com
3	1999	Housing Benefit Overpayments: A Good Practice Guide			National Housing Federation, London		No	Encyclopedia.com
4	2000	The Encyclopedia of Boys' School Stories	Rosemary Auchmuty, Joy Wotton	385	Ashgate, Aldershot	9780754600831	Yes	
5	2001	Bullies, Beaks and Flannelled Fools: An Annotated Bibliography of Boys' School Fiction, 1742–2000, 2nd ed.		337	Author, London	0951637312	Yes	
6	2001	Victorian Boys' School Stories in Books and Periodicals: A Bibliography	Michael Rupert Taylor	107	Author, London		Yes	
7	2002	A Guide to Housing Benefit Overpayments			Notting Hill Housing Trust, London		No	Encyclopedia.com
8	2006	Before Tom Brown: The Birth and Development of the Boys' School Story		16	Children's Books History Society, London		Yes	
9	2010	The Three Lives of Bernard Heldmann		32	Children's Books History Society, London		Yes	
10	2013	From the Penny Dreadful to the Ha'penny Dreadfuller: A Bibliographic History of the Boys' Periodical in Britain 1762–1950		528	The British Library, London	9780712309547	Yes	
11	2013	Wild Boys in the Dock: Victorian Juvenile Literature and Juvenile Crime		33	Children's Books History Society, London		Yes	
12	2016	Pennies, Profits and Poverty: A Biographical Directory of Wealth and Want in Bohemian Fleet Street		550	Hanwell, London	9781518690990	Yes	
13	2016	Henty Goes to School: School Life in the Novels of G.A. Henty, edited with an introduction by Robert J. Kirkpatrick	G. A. Henty	264	CreateSpace (Amazon self-publishing)	9781530447312	Yes	
14	2017	Charles Dickens, Nicholas Nickleby and the Yorkshire schools, Fact v Fiction		375	Mosaic, Middleton-in-Teesdale	9780993597053	Yes	
15	2019	Picturing Tom Brown: How Artists Have Illustrated "Tom Brown's Schooldays"		90	Author, London	9781072137566	No	Bear Alley
16	2019	The Men Who Drew for Boys (and Girls): 101 Forgotten Illustrators of Children's Books 1844–1970		559	Author, London	9781796820980	No	Bear Alley
17	2020	The Lost Diaries of Nigel Molesworth	Geoffrey Willans	69	Author, London	9798602683387	Yes	
18	2024	Before Tom Brown: The Origins of the School Story		232	Lutterworth Press	9780718897376	Yes	
19	2025	Publishers, Profits and Poverty: A Biographical Directory of Publishing in Bohemian Fleet Street		459	Cambridge Scholars Publishing	9781036445935	No	
