= Michael Bergdahl =

American author and professional business speaker

Michael Bergdahl is a (former) executive, author, and professional business speaker.

== Background ==
Bergdahl worked in Bentonville, Arkansas, for Wal-Mart, as the Director of People for the headquarters office, where he worked directly with Wal-Mart's founder Sam Walton. It was he who gave Bergdahl the nickname, "Bird Dawg". Previous to Wal-Mart he worked in the FMCG Industry for PepsiCo's Frito-Lay division in the sales organization and headquarters staff assignments.

== Author ==
Bergdahl's first book, What I Learned from Sam Walton, is about the strategies of Wal-Mart, the world's largest company. His second book, The ten rules of Sam Walton, is about the tactics of the world's richest man. His books were published by Wiley, and have been translated into Russian, Thai, Indonesian, Korean, Simplified Chinese, Traditional Chinese, Vietnamese, and Spanish.
