= Children's Books History Society =

The Children's Books History Society (CBHS) is a group promoting children's literature of the past. It was founded by book critic Brian Alderson in 1969. Publications by the society include three newsletters annually, each with articles, reports and reviews and an Occasional Paper (covering topics such as Early Alphabets, Peter Pan, Chapbooks, and Children's Illustrations of the 1860s) from time to time. In July 1999 the group celebrated the 200th anniversary of the founding of the Religious Tract Society, a leading publisher of children's books in the 19th century.

The Children's Books History Society was initially created as a Branch of the Friends of the Osborne Collection, a collection of early children's books at the Toronto Public Library. It is now independent, although it maintains links to the Osborne Collection.

The society gives a biennial award in honor of Harvey Darton to the author of the best book published in the two preceding years for a book, published in English, which extends our knowledge of some aspect of British children's literature of the past. Society meetings occur in England with a one-day conference with an opportunity to explore a theme in greater depth. Membership is £15 a year for the UK and Europe plus additional mailing costs for those residing outside the U.K.
