= Marshall Township, Pennsylvania =

Township in Pennsylvania, US

Marshall Township, Allegheny County, Pennsylvania
- Township
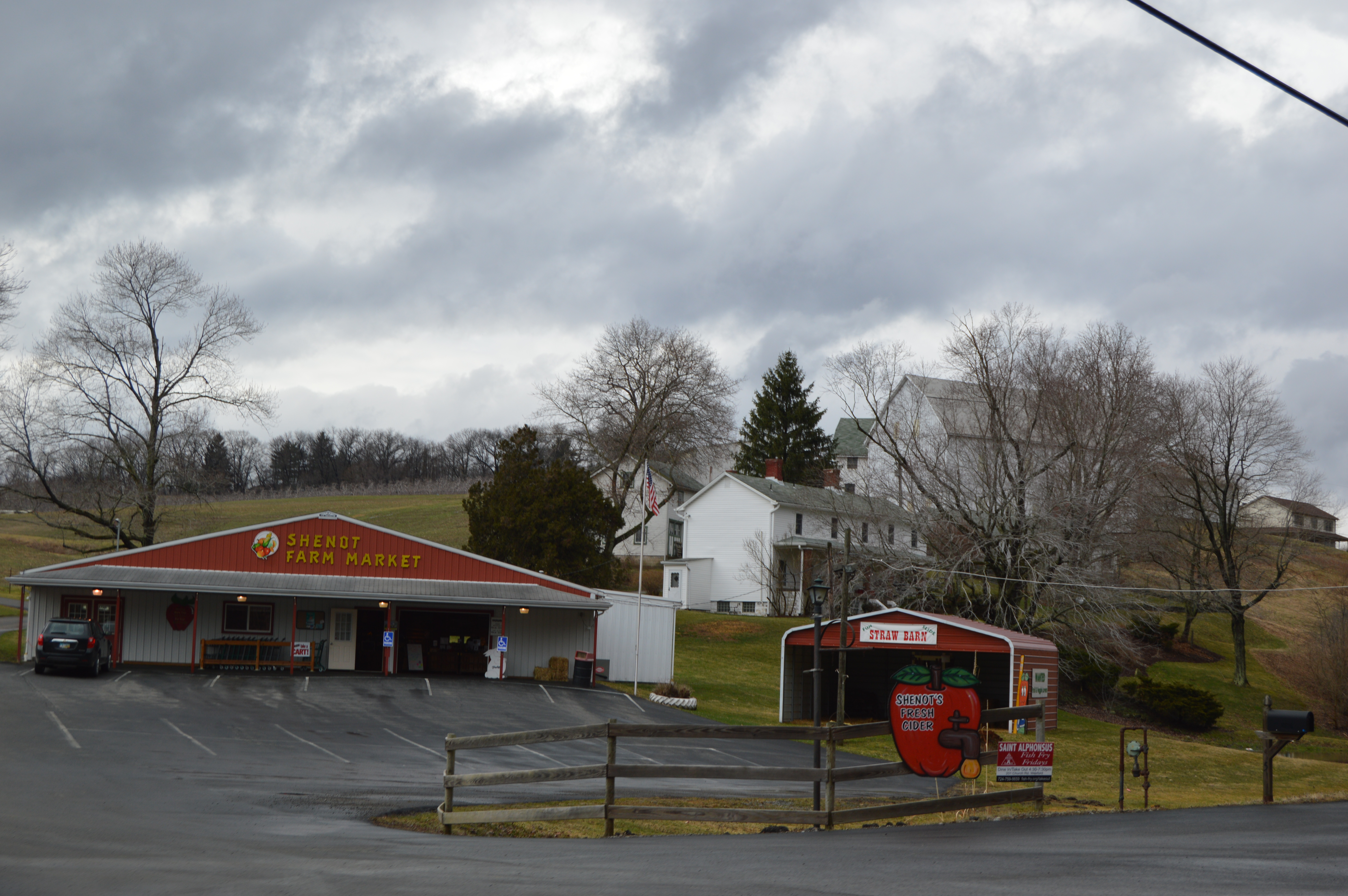
- Shenot Farm Market along Wexford Run Road

- Location in Allegheny County and state of Pennsylvania
- Coordinates: 40°39′10″N 80°06′49″W
- Country: United States
- State: Pennsylvania
- County: Allegheny
- Incorporated: 1863

Government
  - Type: Board of Supervisors
  - President, Board of Supervisors: Thomas Madigan (R)

Area
  - Total: 15.46 sq mi (40.03 km^{2})
  - Land: 15.46 sq mi (40.03 km^{2})
  - Water: 0 sq mi (0.00 km^{2})
- Elevation: 1,194 ft (364 m)

Population (2020)
  - Total: 10,080
  - Estimate (2022): 10,173
  - Density: 570.9/sq mi (220.41/km^{2})
- Time zone: UTC-5 (Eastern (EST))
  - Summer (DST): UTC-4 (EDT)
- ZIP code: 15086, 15005, 15143, 15090
- Area codes: 724, 878
- FIPS code: 42-003-47696
- Website: Marshall Township official website

Marshall Township is a township that is located in Allegheny County, Pennsylvania, United States. The population was 10,080 at the time of the 2020 census.

== History ==
Marshall Township was named for Thomas M. Marshall, who was instrumental in the township's organization. Since the late 1960s it has been home to a large research and business park.

== Geography ==
According to the United States Census Bureau, the township has a total area of 15.6 square miles (40.4 km^{2}), all land. It is part of the North Allegheny School district, along with McCandless and the boroughs of Franklin Park and Bradford Woods.

Marshall Township has five borders, including Cranberry Township in Butler County to the north, Pine Township to the east, Franklin Park to the south and Economy in Beaver County to the west. The township also surrounds most of Bradford Woods.

== Demographics ==
Historical population
Census	Pop.	Note	%±
1970	2,907		—
1980	2,594		−10.8%
1990	4,010		54.6%
2000	5,996		49.5%
2010	6,915		15.3%
2020	10,080		45.8%
2022 (est.)	10,173		0.9%
U.S. Decennial Census

As of the 2000 census, there were 5,996 people, 1,944 households, and 1,675 families residing in the township.

The population density was 384.4 inhabitants per square mile (148.4/km^{2}). There were 2,018 housing units at an average density of 129.4 per square mile (50.0/km^{2}).

The racial makeup of the township was 95.90% White, 1.08% African American, 2.22% Asian, 0.07% from other races, and 0.73% from two or more races. Hispanic or Latino of any race were 0.68% of the population.

There were 1,944 households, out of which 51.2% had children under the age of eighteen living with them; 79.4% were married couples living together, 5.0% had a female householder with no husband present, and 13.8% were non-families; 11.9% of all households were made up of individuals, and 4.6% had someone living alone who was 65 years of age or older.

The average household size was 3.08 and the average family size was 3.37.

Within the township, the population was spread out, with 33.7% of residents who were under the age of eighteen, 4.5% who were aged eighteen to twenty-four, 28.6% from who were aged twenty-five to forty-four, 25.6% who were aged forty-five to sixty-four, and 7.7% who were sixty-five years of age or older. The median age was thirty-eight years.

For every 100 females, there were 100.5 males. For every 100 females who were aged 18 or older, there were 95.8 males.

The median income for a household in the township was $102,351, and the median income for a family was $109,376. Males had a median income of $84,871 compared with that of $38,917 for females.

The per capita income for the township was $42,856.

Approximately 4.7% of families and 5.8% of the population were living below the poverty line, including 6.6% of those who were under the age of 18 and 6.1% of those who were aged 65 or older.

== Government and politics ==
Presidential election results
Year	Republican	Democratic	Third parties
2024	48.8% 3,027	48.7% 3,020	2.5% 153
2020	49.3% 3,044	49.8% 3,078	0.8% 53
2016	54% 2,448	42% 1,902	4% 159
2012	65% 2,638	34% 1,364	1% 26

== Recreation ==
The township participates in the multi-municipality Northland Public Library.

Recreational areas in Marshall Township include Altmyer Park, Knob Hill Community Park, Warrendale Park and a portion of the Pennsylvania State Game Lands Number 203.
