= Depreciation Lands =

Land supplied by Pennsylvania in 1785

Depreciation Lands outline over a map of Pittsburgh and Western Pennsylvania

The Depreciation Lands were a tract of land in Western Pennsylvania that was purchased by Pennsylvania's state government from Native Americans in 1784. The Depreciation Lands, which were split by surveyors, encompassed land from the Ohio River to the south, all the way north the mouth of Mahoning Creek (then known as Mogulbughtiton Creek), bounded by the east by the Allegheny River, and stretching to the state border in the west. The borders of many boroughs and townships are still to this day Depreciation lines, drawn by the original surveyors.

== History ==
The Depreciation Lands were a tract of land within a part of western Pennsylvania that was purchased by the Commonwealth from Native Americans in 1784. The area was located west of the Allegheny River, north of the Ohio River, and was bordered to the north by the east–west line that stretched from the mouth of Mahoning Creek (then known as Mogulbughtiton Creek) to the western border of Pennsylvania.

Before the time of the purchase, The Six Nations used the area for hunting, though the area was mostly uninhabited, save for a small village of approximately 50 cabins north of what is now Ambridge. The purchased land was subdivided into two sections: the Donation Lands and the Depreciation lands. The Donation Lands were farther north than the Depreciation Lands, and were given to each Pennsylvania Line soldier and officer who served in the Continental Army to the end of the Revolutionary War. The remaining Depreciation Lands were given for redemption of depreciation certificates, which were given to soldiers in exchange for their received military pay in depreciated currency.

The Depreciation Lands were divided into five districts from west to east, and eight surveyors were appointed to lay out the land in lots of 200 to 350 acres. From east to west, the surveyors were A. McClean, Major Daniel Leet, Nathaniel Breading, William Alexander, Samuel Nicholson, Samuel Jones, Colonel James Cunningham, and Colonel Joshua Elder. Despite the effort of the Pennsylvania Legislature, the Depreciation Lands were not all sold to deserving veterans. Many sold their depreciation certificates to speculators, and some of the surveyors themselves used their inside information to acquire valuable land.

The Depreciation Lands still have their mark on modern boroughs and townships, whose borders are still based on the Depreciation lines drawn by the original surveyors.

=== Depreciation Certificates ===
During the Revolutionary War, the soldiers of the Continental Army were paid by the Continental Congress with paper money known as Continental Currency. At first, it was backed by gold, but as the war continued more and more paper money was printed with no gold to back it, and this caused the money to depreciate in value. By the end of the war, Continental Currency was virtually worthless, which inspired the expression "Not worth a Continental." The Commonwealth of Pennsylvania helped their poorly paid soldiers by issuing Certificates of Depreciation that could be used for the purchase of land. An Act of the Pennsylvania Legislature passed March 12, 1783, provided for the purchase of the lands still owned by the "Indians" in western Pennsylvania and their sale or donation to veterans.

== Bibliography ==
- Newman, Eric P. The Early Paper Money of America. 3rd edition. Iola, Wisconsin: Krause Publications, 1990. ISBN 0-87341-120-X.
