= McCandless, Pennsylvania =

Township in Pennsylvania, US

- Home rule municipality
- Town of McCandless
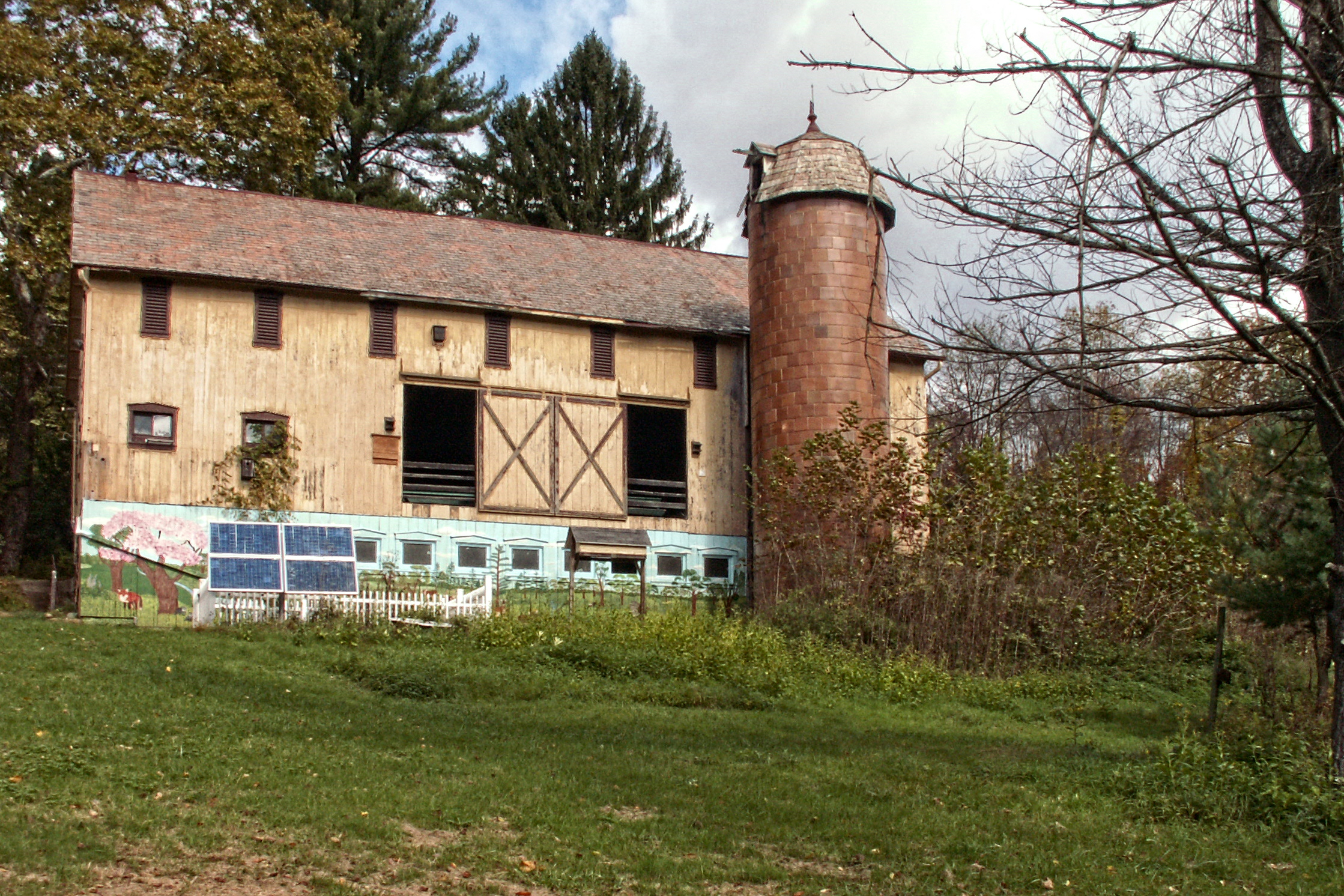
- Latodami Nature Center at North Park

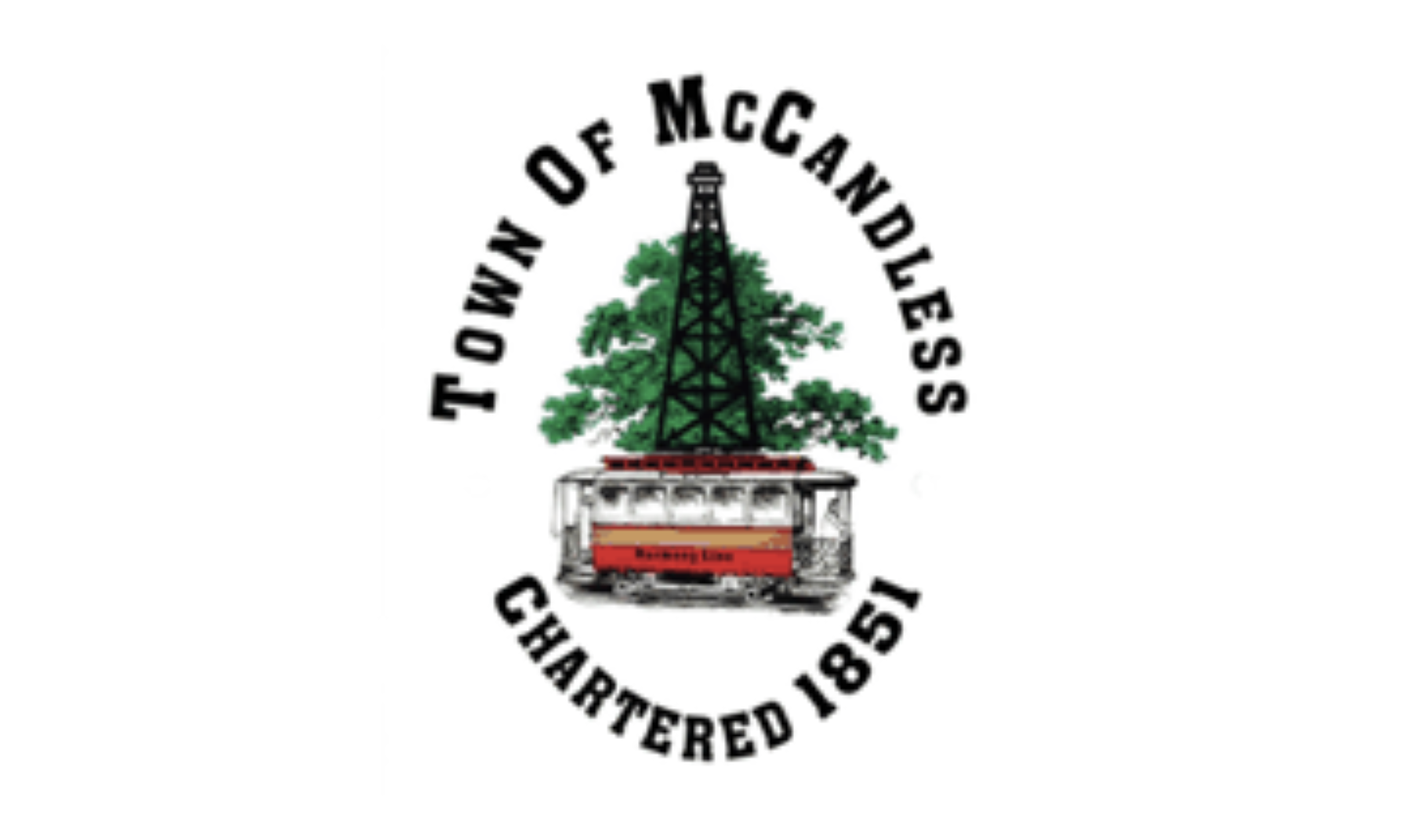
- Flag Seal
- Interactive map of McCandless, Pennsylvania
- Location within Pennsylvania Location within the United States
- Coordinates: 40.57651°N 80.029292°W
- Country: United States
- State: Pennsylvania
- County: Allegheny
- Settled: 1796
- Incorporated: 1851

Government
  - Type: Town Council
  - Council President: Jason Singer
  - Town Manager: John F. Schwend

Area
  - Total: 16.60 sq mi (43.00 km^{2})
  - Land: 16.50 sq mi (42.73 km^{2})
  - Water: 0.10 sq mi (0.27 km^{2})
- Elevation: 1,024 ft (312 m)

Population (2020)
  - Total: 29,709 ▲
  - Estimate (2022): 29,038
  - Density: 1,742.9/sq mi (672.92/km^{2})
- Time zone: UTC−5 (Eastern (EST))
  - Summer (DST): UTC−4 (EDT)
- ZIP Code: 15237, 15090, 15044, 15101, 15127
- Area codes: 412, 724, 878
- FIPS code: 42-003-45900
- Website: McCandless official website

McCandless is a township with home rule status in Allegheny County, Pennsylvania, United States. The population was 29,709 at the 2020 census. It is a suburb in the North Hills of the Pittsburgh metropolitan area.

McCandless is part of the North Allegheny School District and participates in the multi-municipality Northland Public Library. Because of its home rule status, McCandless no longer operates under the First Class Township Code, but it is classified as a first-class township for certain purposes. Although the municipality goes by "Town of McCandless", apart from one exception, a "town" is not a municipal unit in Pennsylvania.

== History ==
Native American artifacts, primarily Iroquois Nation, have been found in areas of the township. Early written history includes a visit by George Washington and his guide, Christopher Gist, in 1753.

The state of Pennsylvania enacted legislation in order to gain Continental Script, a quickly depreciating currency during the Revolutionary War. The legislation ordered for a plan to sell Iroquois land that was known as the Depreciation Lands at the time; this land included the North Hills. Soldiers redeemed their certificates by receiving cash or Iroquois land. Because of this, Iroquois unrest emerged and did not stop until the Iroquois were defeated in 1794.

The first European settler in McCandless Township was James Duff, who had purchased 400 acres (1.6 km^{2}) in 1796. Farming increased in the area, and in 1849, meetings were held, presided over by Daniel Vogel, for the purpose of forming a local government. The township was founded in 1851 and called "Taylor Township". The area was incorporated in 1857 as a second class township and renamed "McCandless Township" in honor of District Judge Wilson McCandless. The published population was 1,482 persons.

During the 1800s McCandless Township was primarily a farming community. During the War of 1812, an important supply route for the transportation of war materials from Pittsburgh to Commodore Perry's forces on Lake Erie passed through the area.

In 1908 an interurban commuter railroad, the Harmony Line, allowed area residents to easily commute to Pittsburgh. A concurrent oil boom resulted in rapid early development, centered on the rail stations in the Highland and Ingomar areas.

By 1931, the Harmony Line was closed because of the growing usage of the automobile.

Allegheny County Commissioner E. V. Babcock initiated the establishment of Allegheny County's North Park. He purchased the land and later sold it to the county at cost. North Park was founded in 1927 by Allegheny County. Approximately 1,600 acres (6.5 km^{2}) of the park, 2.5 square miles (6.5 km^{2}), are located in McCandless. This area represents approximately 15.2% of the town.

Between 1930 and 1950, the town more than doubled its population (from 2,653 to 6,488). By 1960, the population had redoubled (14,582) and has since doubled again. At the 2000 census, the number of households in the town was 11,159.

Expanding population and traffic brought more diversified development into the area. McKnight Road was built in the mid-1950s and became the primary access into the north suburban areas. Retail and office uses occupy some of the McCandless segment of the McKnight corridor. The Community College of Allegheny County opened a campus in the area in 1972. A new mixed-use development acting as a town center, McCandless Crossing, was completed in 2016 and serves as a strip mall as well as an apartment complex and a townhome neighborhood.

== Geography ==
According to the U.S. Census Bureau, the township has a total area of 16.6 square miles (43 km^{2}), of which 16.5 square miles (43 km^{2}) is land and 0.1 square miles (0.26 km^{2}), or 0.66%, is water.

The municipality lies on the Allegheny Plateau and is characterized by generally hilly terrain. A floodplain lies in the area of Pine Creek, which cuts a deep valley through the central portion of the township.

=== Surrounding neighborhoods ===
McCandless has four borders, including Pine Township to the north, Hampton Township to the east, Ross Township to the south and the borough of Franklin Park to the west.

Communities and neighborhoods:

- Allison Park
- Meadow Oaks I & II
- Meadow Oaks III
- Guyton Farms
- Greybrooke
- Bennington Woods
- Pin Oak
- Briarwood
- Park Meadows
- Foxcroft Village
- Coyne Lots I & 2 (Longvue Heights)
- Sample Manor
- Colington Square
- Royal Manor
- Pinnacle Pointe
- Longvue Acres

== Demographics ==
Historical population
Census	Pop.	Note	%±
1860	1,482		—
1870	957		−35.4%
1880	1,010		5.5%
1890	985		−2.5%
1900	1,034		5.0%
1910	987		−4.5%
1920	1,465		48.4%
1930	2,053		40.1%
1940	3,494		70.2%
1950	6,488		85.7%
1960	14,582		124.8%
1970	22,404		53.6%
1980	26,191		16.9%
1990	28,781		9.9%
2000	29,022		0.8%
2010	28,457		−1.9%
2020	29,709		4.4%
2022 (est.)	29,038		−2.3%

As of the census of 2020, there were 29,705 people, 12,265 households, and 2.30 people per household residing in the township. The population density was 1,800.8 inhabitants per square mile (695.3/km^{2}). There were 11,697 housing units at an average density of 707.1 units per square mile (273.0 units/km^{2}). The racial makeup of the township was 85.5% White, 1.9% African American, 0.2% Native American, 6.6% Asian, 0.01% Pacific Islander, 2% from other races, 4.4% from two or more races, and 3.8% Hispanics or Latinos,

There were 11,159 households, out of which 32.2% had children under the age of 18 living with them, 62.8% were married couples living together, 6.1% had a female householder with no husband present, and 29.0% were non-families. 25.0% of all households were made up of individuals, and 8.9% had someone living alone who was 65 years of age or older. The average household size was 2.49 and the average family size was 3.02.

In the township the population was spread out, with 23.6% under the age of 18, 6.8% from 18 to 24, 27.8% from 25 to 44, 25.8% from 45 to 64, and 16.1% who were 65 years of age or older. The median age was 40 years. For every 100 females, there were 90.7 males. For every 100 females age 18 and over, there were 86.9 males.

The median income for a household in the township was $62,159, and the median income for a family was $73,482. Males had a median income of $57,415 versus $33,319 for females. The per capita income for the township was $31,792. About 2.2% of families and 4.0% of the population were below the poverty line, including 3.2% of those under age 18 and 9.1% of those age 65 or over.

== Government and politics ==
Presidential Elections Results
Year	Republican	Democratic	Third Parties
2024	46% 8,724	53% 10,160	1% 286
2020	46% 8,893	52% 9,980	1% 237
2016	51% 8,469	45% 7,575	4% 686
2012	59% 9,557	40% 6,514	1% 147

- [2017-2019] Democrats-3 (Zachary, Mertz, Schweiger), Mulitparty-2 (Walkauskas, McKim), Republicans-2 (Kirk, Powers)
