= Wexford, Pennsylvania =

Unincorporated community in Pennsylvania, US

- Unincorporated community
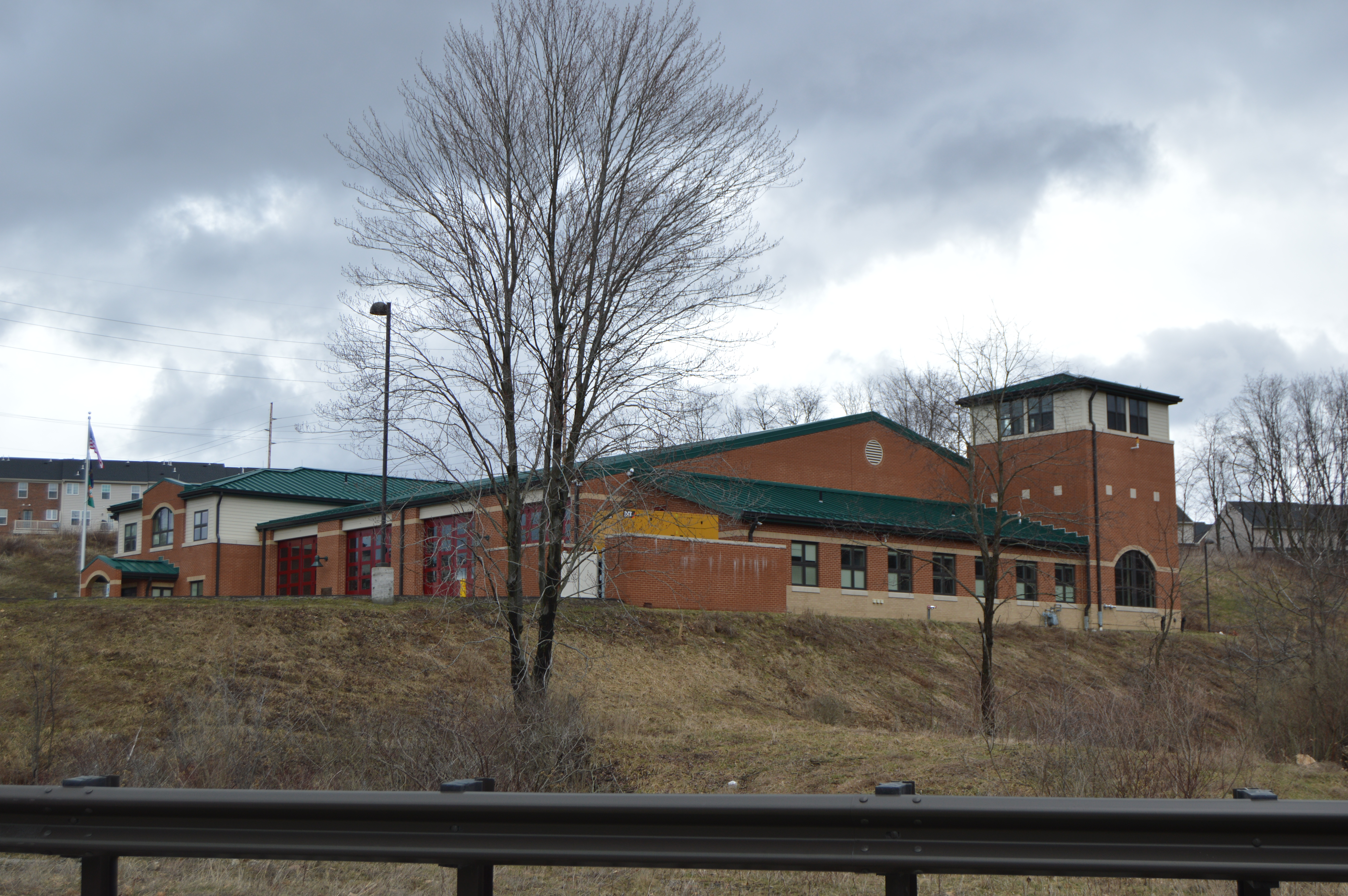
- Wexford Volunteer Fire Company Station 228 on Chapel Drive

- Location within Pennsylvania Location within the United States
- Coordinates: 40°37′35″N 80°3′21″W
- Country: United States
- State: Pennsylvania
- County: Allegheny
- Municipality: Franklin Park, McCandless, Pine, Marshall
- Elevation: 1,227 ft (374 m)
- Time zone: UTC-5 (Eastern (EST))
  - Summer (DST): UTC-4 (EDT)
- ZIP Code: 15090
- Area codes: 412, 724, 878
- GNIS feature ID: 1191197

Wexford is an unincorporated community in Allegheny County, Pennsylvania, United States. It is a suburb in the Pittsburgh metropolitan area split across the incorporated places of Franklin Park, McCandless, Pine Township and Marshall Township. It is named after County Wexford, Ireland.

== History ==
Unlike most of Allegheny County, Wexford was removed from area code 412 when it was subdivided in 1998, being placed in area code 724 instead. Part of this was because of Wexford's close proximity to Cranberry Township, Butler County, Pennsylvania.

The Wexford area is a growing community with subdivisions and neighborhoods constantly increasing. To account for the immense increase in population, in 2012 the county ultimately expanded U.S. Route 19, the road that runs through the "flats", by adding a center turn lane. Before its expansion, the road was four lanes (two each way), and heavy traffic caused significant problems for drivers attempting to perform left turns.

== Parks and recreation ==
Adjacent to Wexford is North Park and North Park lake. This area is a great asset to the community featuring many hiking/biking trails, a 5-mile paved running path around the lake, many pavilions for outdoor events, an outdoor ice rink, a golf course, dog parks, playgrounds, and local restaurants and shops. The lake underwent construction, including dredging and refinishing shorelines, between 2009 and 2012.

== Education ==
Wexford is home to North Allegheny Senior High School, Seelos Academy, Marshall Middle School, Eden Christian Academy, and (Wexford) Elementary School.

== Notable people ==
- Christina Aguilera, Grammy award-winning singer, actress, and pop culture icon; lived in Wexford during her adolescence
- Charlie Batch, former professional football player, Detroit Lions and Pittsburgh Steelers
- Bobby Grier, civil rights icon and Pittsburgh Panthers Hall of Famer
- James Harrison, Pittsburgh Steelers linebacker
- Jake Herbert, folkstyle and freestyle wrestler, 2009 World silver medalist, represented USA at 2012 Summer Olympics
- Cameron Heyward, Pittsburgh Steelers defensive end
- Cy Hungerford, longtime editorial cartoonist for the Pittsburgh Post-Gazette
- Meghan Klingenberg, 2015 FIFA Women's World Cup Champion, United States women's national soccer team defender
- Bradley C. Livezey, ornithologist at the Carnegie Museum of Natural History
- Jeffrey McLaughlin, rowing medalist at the 1988 and 1992 Olympics, Northeastern University Hall of Fame
- Frank Nicotero, comedian
- John Smiley, former pitcher for the Pittsburgh Pirates.
- Dan Smyers, half of country duo Dan + Shay
- Mike Wagner, Super Bowl winning defensive back for the Pittsburgh Steelers
- Bob Walk, former Major League Baseball pitcher and long-time broadcast announcer for the Pittsburgh Pirates
