= Pine Township, Allegheny County, Pennsylvania =

Township in Pennsylvania, US

Township of Pine, Allegheny County, Pennsylvania
- Township
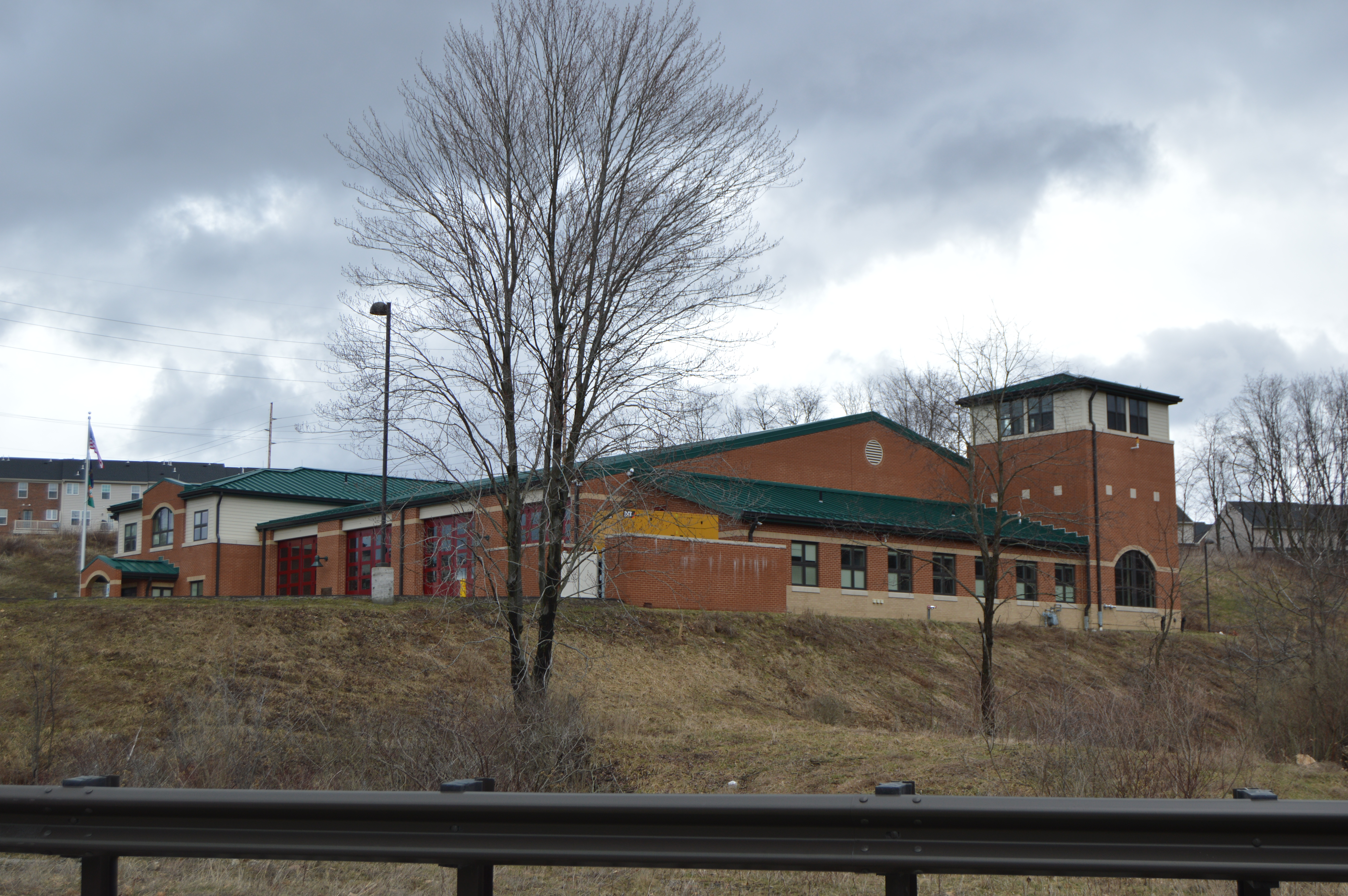
- Wexford Volunteer Fire Company Station 228

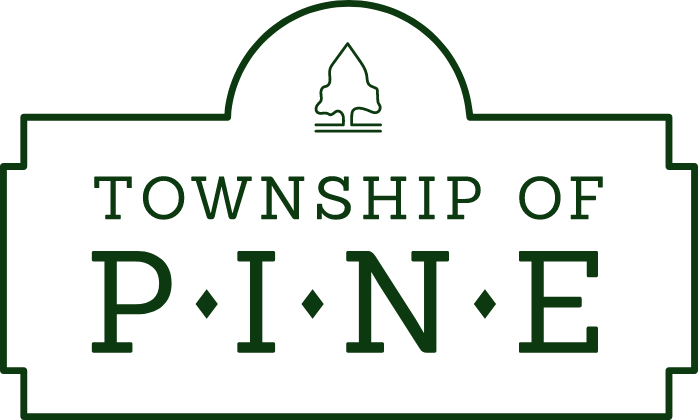
- Logo

- Location in Allegheny County and state of Pennsylvania
- Coordinates: 40°37′10″N 80°01′29″W
- Country: United States
- State: Pennsylvania
- County: Allegheny
- Established: 1796

Government
  - Type: Board of Supervisors

Area
  - Total: 16.98 sq mi (43.97 km^{2})
  - Land: 16.96 sq mi (43.93 km^{2})
  - Water: 0.012 sq mi (0.03 km^{2})
- Elevation: 1,129 ft (344 m)

Population (2020)
  - Total: 14,691
  - Density: 762.6/sq mi (294.46/km^{2})
- Time zone: UTC-5 (Eastern (EST))
  - Summer (DST): UTC-4 (EDT)
- ZIP code: 15090 (Wexford); 15044 (Gibsonia)
- Area codes: 724, 878
- FIPS code: 42-003-60272
- Website: Township of Pine

Pine Township is a township that is located in Allegheny County, Pennsylvania, United States. The population was 14,691 at the time of the 2020 census.

== History ==
Pine Township was named for the abundance of pine trees.

== Geography ==
According to the United States Census Bureau, the township has a total area of 16.8 square miles (44 km^{2}), of which 0.06% is water.

== Surrounding neighborhoods ==
Pine Township has nine borders. Five are in Allegheny County, including Richland Township to the east, McCandless to the south, Franklin Park to the southwest, and Bradford Woods and Marshall Township to the west. The remaining four borders are with Butler County neighborhoods to the north: Cranberry Township and Seven Fields to the northwest, Adams Township to the north and Valencia to the northeast.

== Government and politics ==
=== Board of supervisors ===
- [2022-2024] Republicans-4 (White, Mackie, Avolio, Colombo), Democrats-1 (Donahue)

=== Presidential voting ===
Presidential election results
Year	Republican	Democratic	Third parties
2024	51% 4,933	48% 4,640	1% 136
2020	52% 4,634	46% 4,167	1% 93
2016	60% 3,951	40% 2,609	0% 40
2012	70% 4,327	29% 1,782	1% 41

== Demographics ==
Historical population
Census	Pop.	Note	%±
1850	2,209		—
1860	1,021		−53.8%
1870	718		−29.7%
1880	773		7.7%
1890	746		−3.5%
1900	658		−11.8%
1910	698		6.1%
1920	685		−1.9%
1930	937		36.8%
1940	1,191		27.1%
1950	1,732		45.4%
1960	3,613		108.6%
1970	4,259		17.9%
1980	3,908		−8.2%
1990	4,048		3.6%
2000	7,683		89.8%
2010	11,497		49.6%
2020	14,691		27.8%

As of the 2000 census, there were 7,683 people, 2,411 households, and 2,119 families residing in the township. The population density was 457.7 inhabitants per square mile (176.7/km^{2}). There were 2,500 housing units at an average density of 148.9 per square mile (57.5/km^{2}). The racial makeup of the township was 97.16% White, 0.79% African American, 0.07% Native American, 1.12% Asian, 0.03% Pacific Islander, 0.16% from other races, and 0.68% from two or more races. Hispanic or Latino of any race were 0.74% of the population.

There were 2,411 households, out of which 51.6% had children under the age of 18 living with them, 82.2% were married couples living together, 4.0% had a female householder with no husband present, and 12.1% were non-families. 10.5% of all households were made up of individuals, and 4.4% had someone living alone who was 65 years of age or older. The average household size was 3.14 and the average family size was 3.40.

In the township the population was spread out, with 34.5% under the age of 18, 3.3% from 18 to 24, 30.3% from 25 to 44, 22.3% from 45 to 64, and 9.6% who were 65 years of age or older. The median age was 37 years. For every 100 females there were 96.1 males. For every 100 females age 18 and over, there were 92.1 males.

The median income for a household in the township was $85,817, and the median income for a family was $93,201. Males had a median income of $75,418 versus $35,909 for females. The per capita income for the township was $35,202. About 3.6% of families and 3.8% of the population were below the poverty line, including 3.9% of those under age 18 and 7.2% of those age 65 or over.
