= Gibsonia, Pennsylvania =

Unincorporated community in Pennsylvania, US

- Census-designated place
- Location in Allegheny County and the U.S. state of Pennsylvania
- Coordinates: 40°37′48″N 79°58′10″W
- Country: United States
- State: Pennsylvania
- County: Allegheny
- Township: Richland

Area
  - Total: 3.85 sq mi (9.96 km^{2})
  - Land: 3.85 sq mi (9.96 km^{2})
  - Water: 0 sq mi (0.00 km^{2})

Population (2020)
  - Total: 2,786
  - Density: 724.1/sq mi (279.58/km^{2})
- Time zone: UTC-5 (EST)
  - Summer (DST): UTC-4 (EDT)
- ZIP code: 15044
- Area codes: 724, 878
- School District: Pine-Richland School District, Deer Lakes School District, Hampton Township School District, Mars Area School District, North Allegheny School District

Gibsonia is an unincorporated community and census-designated place in Richland Township, Allegheny County, in the U.S. state of Pennsylvania, north of the city of Pittsburgh.

It had a population of 2,785 at the 2020 Census. Its ZIP code is 15044.

== Geography ==
Gibsonia is located in the central and southwest parts of Richland Township, 16 miles (26 km) north of downtown Pittsburgh. The CDP's elevation is 1,037 feet (316 m) above sea level. Gibsonia appears on the Valencia U.S. Geological Survey Map. The area is in the Eastern time zone (GMT -5).

== History ==
Historical population
Census	Pop.	Note	%±
2010	2,733		—
2020	2,785		1.9%
U.S. Decennial Census

Gibsonia was named in honor of the Gibson family who settled the area; their original house was demolished in December 2019. The early history of Gibsonia is, naturally enough, interwoven with the history of the Gibson family. About the time of the Civil War, Charles Gibson Jr. built the first steam flour mill west of the Alleghenies on Grubbs Road. His granddaughter, Nancy Gibson James, recalls hearing her uncle tell of the farmers riding to the mill with sacks of grain across the saddles. The Gibson family homestead was built by her grandfather, Charles Gibson Jr., in 1839. Just below the former site of the home, near the railroad crossing, still remains the foundation of Charles Gibson's general store. This building, destroyed by fire in 1908, besides housing the store was also the first post office in Gibsonia. For about ten years before it burned it was in use as a mission of the Christian & Missionary Alliance Church.

The village was linked to Pittsburgh and Butler by the Pittsburgh and Butler Street Railway in 1907. The line closed in 1931, its services having been replaced by buses along Route 8.

It is the home of the Western Pennsylvania Model Railroad Museum.

== Education ==
The area around Gibsonia is mainly located in the Pine-Richland School District, as well as the Hampton Township School District, North Allegheny School District, Deer Lakes School District, and a small portion of the Mars Area School District. According to Greatschools.com, Pine-Richland School District ranks 10/10, Hampton Township School District ranks 10/10, Deer Lakes School District ranks 7/10, and Mars Area School District ranks 9/10 based on academic performance on state tests.

The Aquinas Academy of Pittsburgh is located south of Gibsonia in Hampton Township. It is a private Catholic school serving Pre-K through Grade 12.

Gibsonia is also the site of Chatham University's Eden Hall campus, which is used for various environmental studies, and as a community college for Gibsonia.

== Notable people ==
- Erik Buell, founder, Erik Buell Racing; CTO, Buell Motorcycle Company
- David I. Cleland, the "Father of Project Management"
- Jackie Evancho, classical crossover singer, actress, and model
- Stephen Frick, retired NASA astronaut and commander of two space shuttle missions in 2002 and 2008
- Meghan Klingenberg, member of United States Women's National Soccer Team
- Louis J. Reizenstein, philanthropist, international importer of glass and china ware
- Florence S. Reizenstein, civil rights activist
- Fran Rogel, Penn State and Pittsburgh Steeler All-Pro running back
- Brandon Saad, National Hockey League player and two-time Stanley Cup winner with the Chicago Blackhawks
- Jonas Salk, resident when he developed the vaccine for polio
- Jay Timmons, college football cornerback for the Ohio State Buckeyes
- Joe Trees, industrialist and noted philanthropist; his 2,600-acre (11 km^{2}) estate in Gibsonia was largely devoted to fruit trees
- Neil Walker, former Pittsburgh Pirates second baseman
