= Order of the Crown (Belgium) =

National order of the Kingdom of Belgium

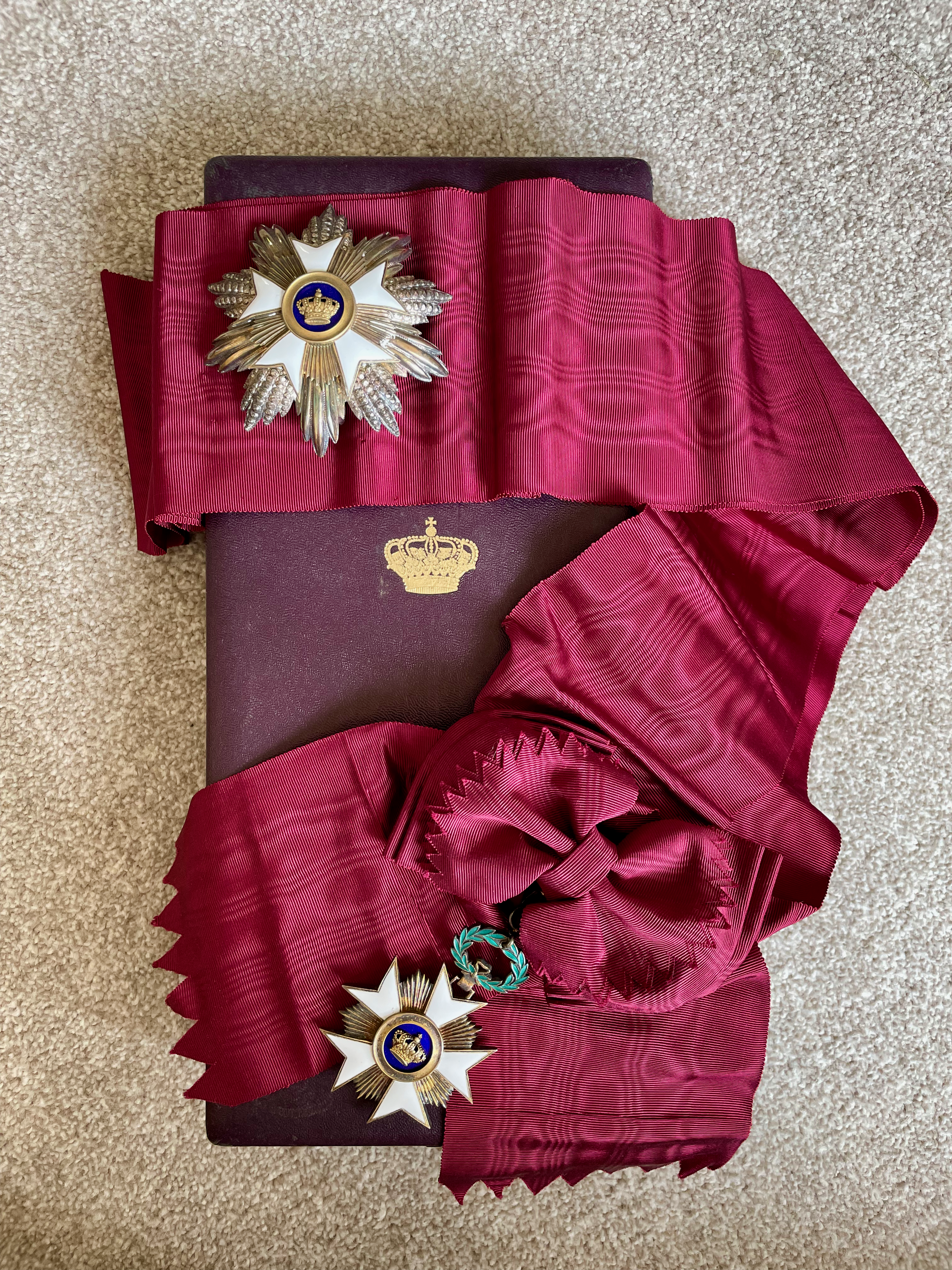
- Grand Cross of the Order of the Crown

Awarded by Kingdom of Belgium
- Type: Order of Merit with five classes, plus two palms and three medals
- Established: 15 October 1897; 1897 - 1908 (Order of Congo); 1908 - present (as Belgian Order)
- Motto: TRAVAIL ET PROGRES - ARBEID EN VOORUITGANG
- Eligibility: Eligible for persons above the age of 42
- Awarded for: Meritorious service to the Belgian state
- Status: Currently constituted
- Grand Master: His Majesty King Philippe
- Grades: Grand Cross; Grand Officer; Commander; Officer; Knight

Precedence
- Next (higher): Order of the Lion
- Next (lower): Order of Leopold II

The Order of the Crown (French: Ordre de la Couronne, Dutch: Kroonorde) is a national order of the Kingdom of Belgium. The Order is one of Belgium's highest honors.

== History ==
The Order was established on October 15, 1897, by King Leopold II in his capacity as ruler of the Congo Free State. The order was first intended to recognize heroic deeds and distinguished service achieved for service in the Congo Free State. In 1908, the Order of the Crown was made a national honour of Belgium, junior to the Order of Leopold.

Currently, the Order of the Crown is awarded for services rendered to the Belgian state, especially for meritorious service in public employment. The Order of the Crown is also awarded for distinguished artistic, literary or scientific achievements, or for commercial or industrial services in Belgium or Africa.

The Order may also be bestowed to foreign nationals and is frequently awarded to military and diplomatic personnel of other countries stationed in (or providing support to) Belgium. During the Second World War, the Order of the Crown was extensively authorized for award to Allied military personnel who had helped to liberate Belgium from the occupation forces of Nazi Germany.

The Order of the Crown is awarded by royal decree.

== Classes ==
The Order of the Crown is awarded in five classes, plus two palms and three medals:

- Grand Cross, which wears the badge on a sash on the right shoulder, plus the star on the left chest;
- Grand Officer, which wears a star on the left chest, and may also wear the neck badge;
- Commander, which wears the badge on a neck ribbon;
- Officer, which wears the badge on a ribbon with rosette on the left chest;
- Knight, which wears the badge on a ribbon on the left chest;
- Golden Palms, which wears a wreath of golden palms on a ribbon on the left chest;
- Silver Palms, which wears a wreath of silver palms on a ribbon on the left chest;
- Gold Medal, who wears the medal on the left chest;
- Silver Medal, who wears the medal on the left chest;
- Bronze Medal, who wears the medal on the left chest.

== Insignia ==
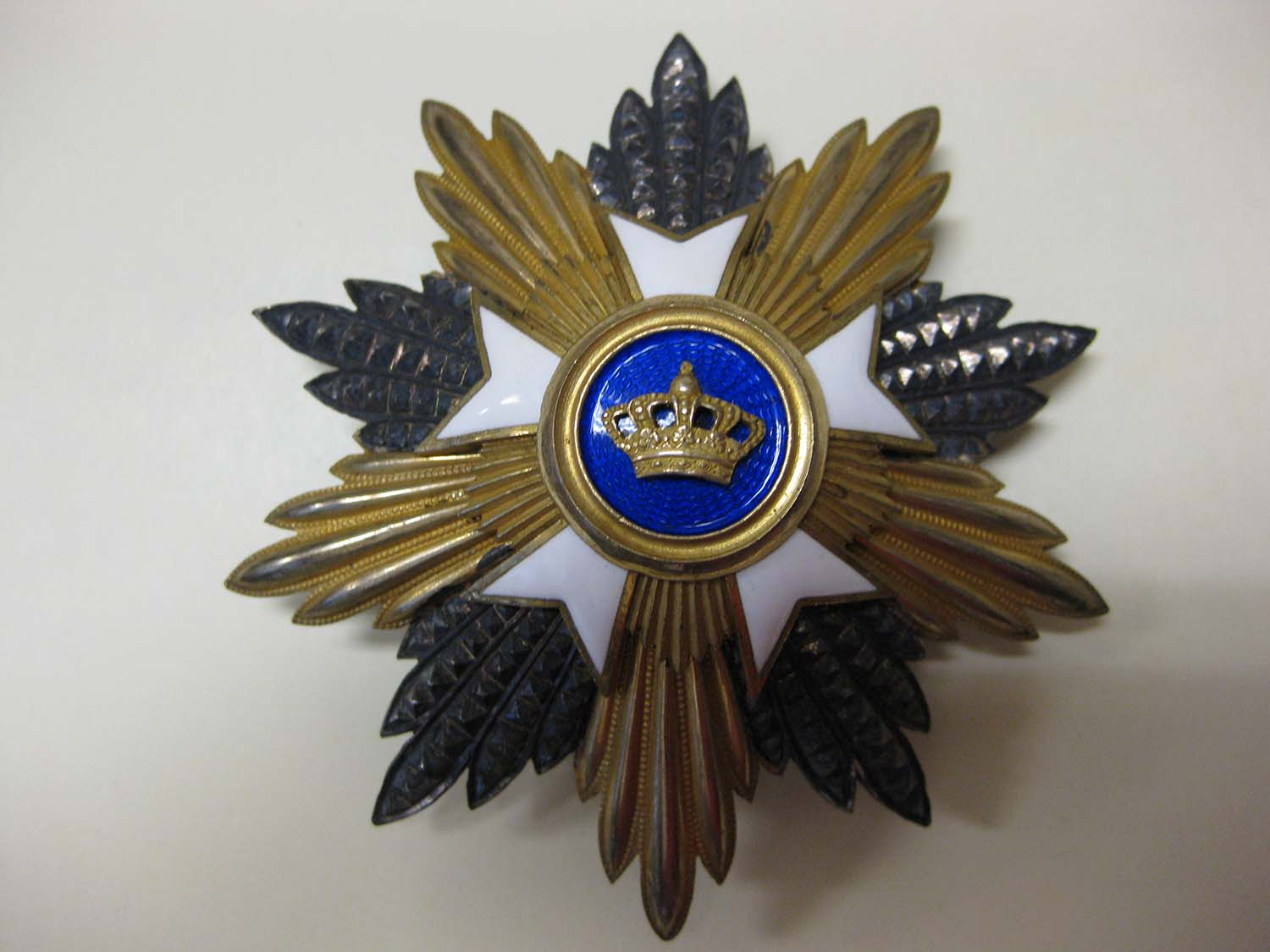
Grand Cross breast star.

The badge of the Order is a white-enamelled Maltese cross with straight rays, in silver for the Knight class and in gold for the higher classes. The obverse central disc has a gold crown on a blue enamelled background; the reverse central disc has the face-to-face monogram "L" (for King Leopold II) on a blue enamelled background. The badge is suspended from a green-enamelled wreath of laurel and oak leaves.

The plaque for Grand Cross is a faceted silver five-pointed star with golden rays between the branches of the star. The centre shows the obverse of a commander's cross. The plaque for Grand Officer is a faceted five-armed 'Maltese asterisk' (see Maltese cross), with golden rays between the arms. The centre shows the obverse of an officer's cross.

The medal is round in gold, silver and bronze versions, with a suspension in the form of a royal crown with two pendelia and a ribbon ring. The obverse shows a finely ribbed central area with bead surround, with the royal crown superimposed. The surrounding circlet carries the motto of the Belgian Congo: Travail et Progrès (work and progress) —the later issues are bilingual including the Dutch Arbeid en Vooruitgang in the lower half of the circlet. The reverse is a stylised 'double L' crowned Leopold II monogram within a palm wreath.

The ribbon of the order is usually plain maroon. However, if the order is awarded in special circumstances, the ribbon of the Officer and Knight classes show the following variations:

- Crossed swords are added to the ribbon when awarded in wartime (if the order was awarded during the Second World War or during the Korean War, a small bar is added to the ribbon mentioning the name of the war);
- The ribbon has a vertical gold border on both sides when awarded for a special act of valour;
- The ribbon has a central vertical gold stripe when awarded for an exceptionally meritorious act;
- A gold star is added to the ribbon when the recipient has been mentioned in despatches at the national level;
- Silver or gold palms are added to the ribbon when awarded in wartime to military personnel.

Stars, palms, borders or stripes can be awarded together, but these deviations are currently only rarely awarded.

The ribbon of the palms and medals has a vertical white border on both sides as well as a metal pin showing a reduction of the palm or medal.

The ribbon bar of the order, which is worn on the semi-formal dress uniform is:

Ribbon bars
Grand Cross	Grand Officer	Commander	Officer	Knight
Golden Palms	Silver Palms	Gold Medal	Silver Medal	Bronze Medal

Despite the fact that, in contrast to the Order of Leopold, no maritime division of the Order of the Crown exists, some unofficial decorations with crossed anchors under the wreath are known to exist.

== Award conditions ==
=== Current award conditions of Belgian national orders ===
National orders are awarded by royal decree at fixed dates: 8 April (birthday of King Albert I), 15 November (King's Feast), and in some cases on 21 July (Belgian national holiday) to reward meritorious services to the Kingdom of Belgium based on the career path and age of the recipient. A number of different regulations rule the award of national orders for the various ministries. In addition, the national orders may be awarded by the king for especially meritorious deeds. The royal decrees are published in the Belgian official journal, Moniteur Belge.

For people who are not Belgian, honours are not published in the Moniteur and bestowed all year round by the foreign office. Recent example is the Grand Cross of ambassador Vershbow.

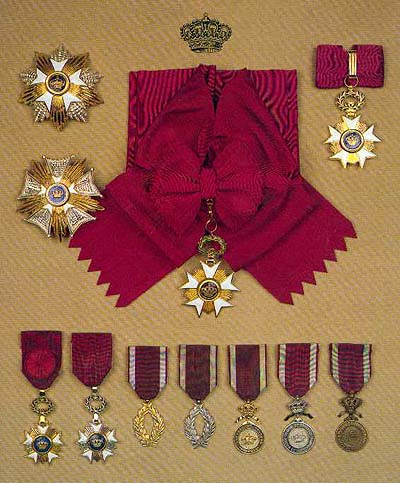
Top left: Grand Cross' star, middle left: Grand Officer plaque, top center: Grand Cross' sash, top right: Commander's cross, bottom, from left to right: Officer's cross, Knight's cross, Gold Palms, Silver Palms, Gold Medal, Silver Medal, Bronze Medal (courtesy Société de l'Ordre de Léopold)

The ministry responsible for foreign affairs, currently the Federal Public Service (SPF/FOD) Foreign Affairs, administers the national orders and the minister has the role of advisor in cases not fitting within a regulation.

For the award of national orders for persons to whom no regulation applies or has been adopted, the number of awards is limited every year by decision of the Council of Ministers (contingent).

The classes of the national orders are integrated in a combined hierarchy defined by law, whereby within one class the Order of Leopold is senior to the Order of the Crown, which is senior to the Order of Leopold II. One cannot be awarded a national order at a level below the highest that the recipient has already received.

Persons who are the subject of criminal proceedings will usually not be awarded a national order until they are declared not guilty.

=== Award conditions to military personnel ===
The Order of the Crown is mostly awarded to military personnel on the basis of their length of service, although exceptions to that rule exist where the order is presented to military personnel for exceptional or meritorious service. (e.g. the Chief of Defence is commonly presented with the Grand Cross after 1 or 2 years of service as CHOD). When officers are considered for the award based on their length of service, their years of service in a non-officer's rank count for half. The first twelve years of service as a member of the flying personnel counts double.

- Grand Officer: Awarded after 38 years of meritorious service to a general officer with minimum rank of lieutenant-general;
- Commander: Awarded after 32 years of meritorious service to a field officer with minimum rank of colonel;
- Officer: Awarded after 25 years of meritorious service to a commissioned officer;
- Knight: Awarded after 15 years of meritorious service to a commissioned officer or after 35 years of meritorious service as a non-commissioned officer;
- Golden Palms: Awarded after 25 years of meritorious service to a non-commissioned officer, and after 35 years of service for a private or corporal;
- Silver Palms: Awarded after 30 years of meritorious service for a private or corporal.

For awards to military personnel, there is no minimum age requirement.

=== Award conditions for long civilian service ===
The palms and the medals of the Order of the Crown may be awarded to workers in the private sector or contractual employees of the public sector, as well as some public sector employees such as prison supervisors, ushers, burgomasters, police commissioners, local police officers, or members of town councils.

- Golden Palms: Awarded after 45 years of professional activity, or at the time of retirement after having worked for a minimum of 40 years;
- Gold Medal: Awarded after 35 years of professional activity.

In addition, the gold medal, the Silver Palms and the Golden Palms are awarded to the presidents, secretaries and members of the board of directors of representative trade organisations such as trade unions on the basis of the number of members of the organisation, of the length of their membership of the board, and on the length of their tenure on the board.

The Knight's Cross of the Order of the Crown is also awarded to the members of the national and provincial committees for the promotion of labour who have reached the age of 42 after a tenure of 10 years (national committee) or 20 years (provincial committee) and, after 30 years of service, to the secretaries of the provincial committees for the promotion of labour who have reached the age of 62.

The medal could also be awarded without the rigid 'time in service' criteria to administrators, directors, department heads, artisans, architects, chemists, specialist craftsmen, etc., each case for an award assessed on an individual basis.

The bronze medal appears to have been confined mainly to the European workers of the Belgian Congo or Congo Free State for 11 years service, apart from a period—duration unknown—when it was also used in Belgium to reward firemen and rural guards for 40 years' service.

== Recipients ==
=== Grand Crosses of the Order of the Crown ===
- Guillaume, Grand Duke of Luxembourg
- Stéphanie, Grand Duchess of Luxembourg
- Kiko, Princess Akishino
- Princess Benedikte of Denmark
- Queen Máxima of the Netherlands
- Queen Mary of Denmark
- Prince Joachim of Denmark
- Fumihito, Prince Akishino
- Prince Constantijn of the Netherlands
- Princess Laurentien of the Netherlands
- Princess Margriet of the Netherlands
- Princess Astrid, Mrs. Ferner
- Princess Margaret, Countess of Snowdon
- Gaston, Viscount Eyskens
- Douglas MacArthur
- Chester W. Nimitz
- Johan Furstner
- Emile Wauters
- Kim Gevaert
- Kōnosuke Matsushita - 1972
- Tia Hellebaut
- August De Boodt
- Jacques van Ypersele de Strihou
- Justine Henin
- Kim Clijsters
- Pia Kjærsgaard - 2017
- Anders Samuelsen - 2017
- Lars Løkke Rasmussen - 2017
- Pieter van Vollenhoven
- Hamengkubuwono IX
- Maraden Panggabean
- Sudharmono
- Emil Salim
- Sumitro Djojohadikusumo

=== Other ===
- Charles Aznavour
- Lieven Bertels
- Philippe Bouvard
- Constance, Lady Baird
- Kees van Dongen
- Sholto Douglas, 1st Baron Douglas of Kirtleside
- Serge Dumont
- Pascal Duquenne
- Sir Edward Elgar
- Erol Gelenbe
- Gerard Gillen
- Howard Gutman
- Marc Herman
- Maurice Houtart
- J. G. ten Houten
- Ivo van Hove
- Wojciech Jaruzelski
- Victor, Baron Horta
- Viatcheslav Moshe Kantor
- Eugène Laermans
- Claude Lelouch
- Allan Lockheed
- Malcolm Lockheed
- Philip Mansel
- James Fitzgerald Martin
- Sir Henry De Mel
- Olivier Messiaen
- George Minne
- Notis Mitarachi
- Diana Nausėdienė
- Edwin B. Parker
- Paul Richey
- Louis Reizenstein
- Victor Rousseau
- Mark Rutte
- Maharaja Sir Kishan Singh of Bharatpur
- Geoffrey Spicer-Simson
- Steven Spielberg
- Herman Teirlinck
- Andor Thoma
- Peter Townsend
- Theodore Whitmarsh
- Karel van de Woestijne
- Philippe Wolfers

== Equivalent orders ==
Even though orders from different States are not always easy to compare, the Order of the Crown is roughly equivalent to the following orders from other States.

- The British Order of the British Empire
- The French Ordre National du Mérite, which is the second highest French order and has similar classes and award conditions.
- The Luxembourg Order of the Oak Crown, which is the third highest Luxembourgian order and has similar classes.
- The Dutch Order of Orange-Nassau, which is the third Dutch national order and has similar classes.
- The Royal Norwegian Order of Merit, which is currently the second highest Norwegian order and has similar classes.
- The Swedish Order of Vasa, which is the second highest Swedish order awarded more widely than to Heads of State and has similar classes. Prior to 1975, the Swedish Order of the Polar Star would be equivalent to the Order of the Crown instead.

== See also ==
Grand masters

- Leopold II - Albert I - Leopold III - Baudouin - Albert II- Philippe

Recipients

- Category:Grand Crosses of the Order of the Crown (Belgium)
- Category:Grand Officers of the Order of the Crown (Belgium)
- Category:Commanders of the Order of the Crown (Belgium)
- Category:Officers of the Order of the Crown (Belgium)
- Category:Knights of the Order of the Crown (Belgium)
- Category:Recipients of the Order of the Crown (Belgium)

Other Belgian orders

- Order of Leopold (Belgium)
- Order of the African Star
- Royal Order of the Lion
- Order of Leopold II

Lists

- Orders, decorations, and medals of Belgium
- List of military decorations

== Gallery ==
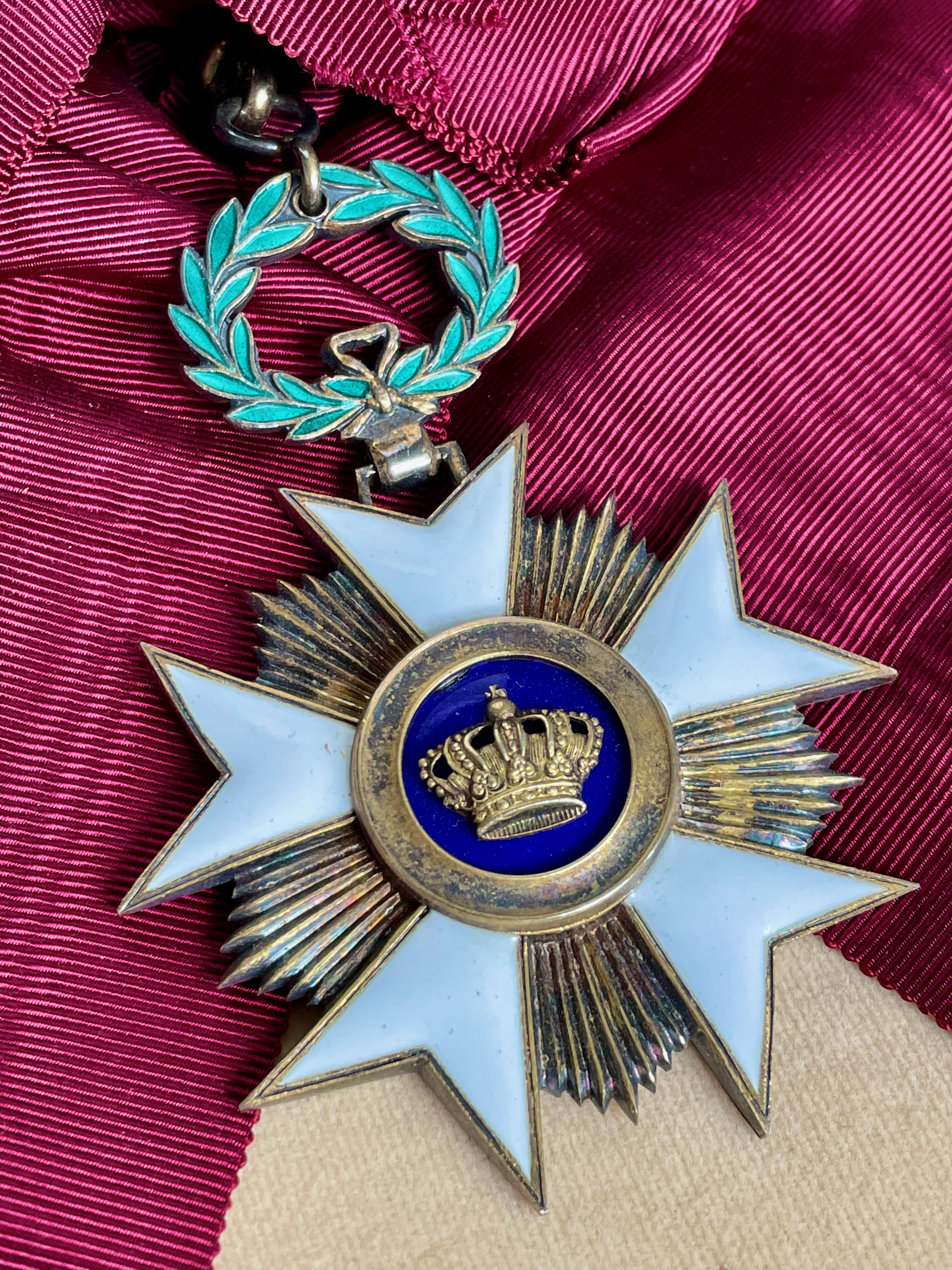
Grand Cross badge.

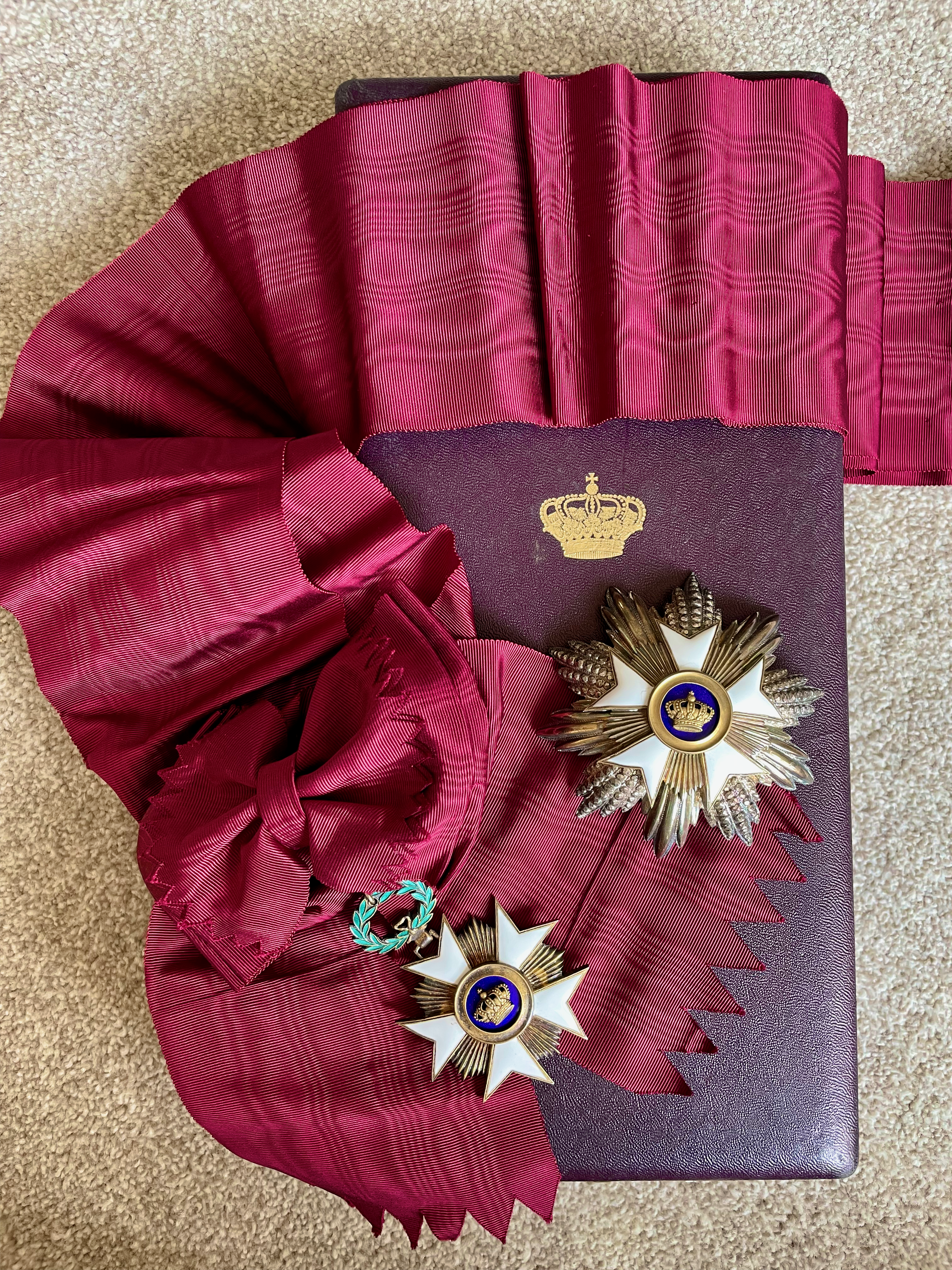
Grand Cross set of insignia.

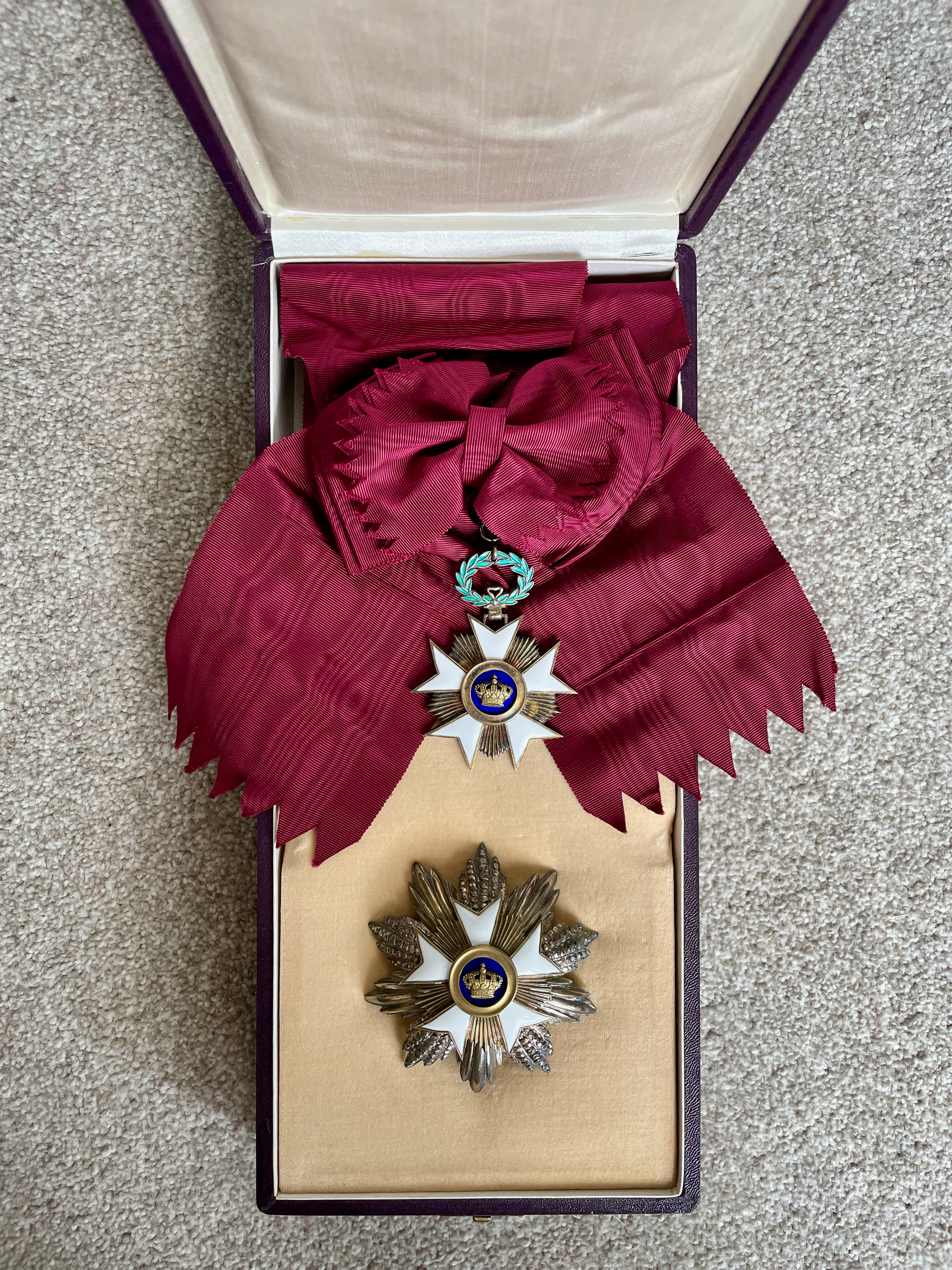
Grand Cross in case.

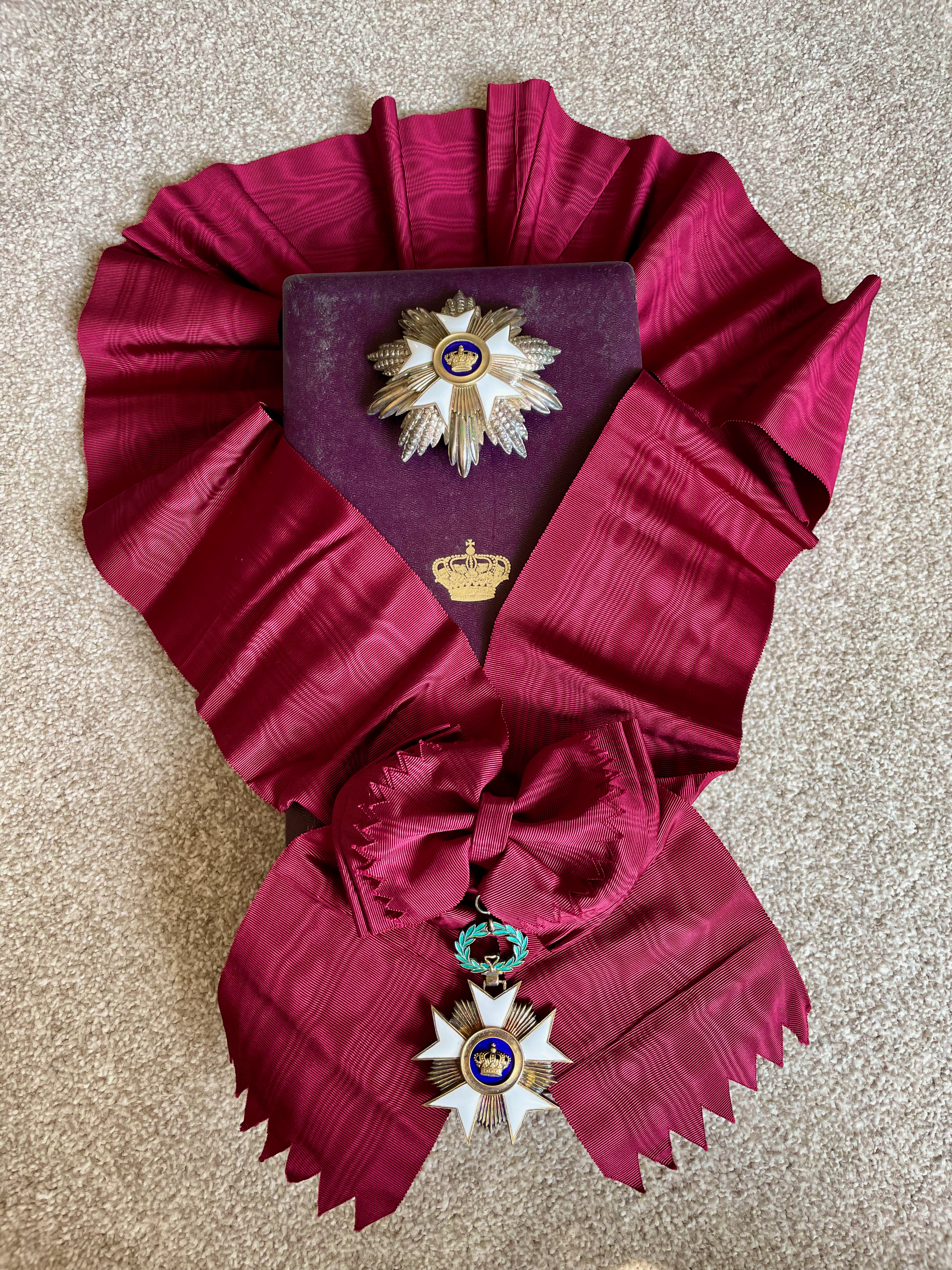
Grand Cross set.

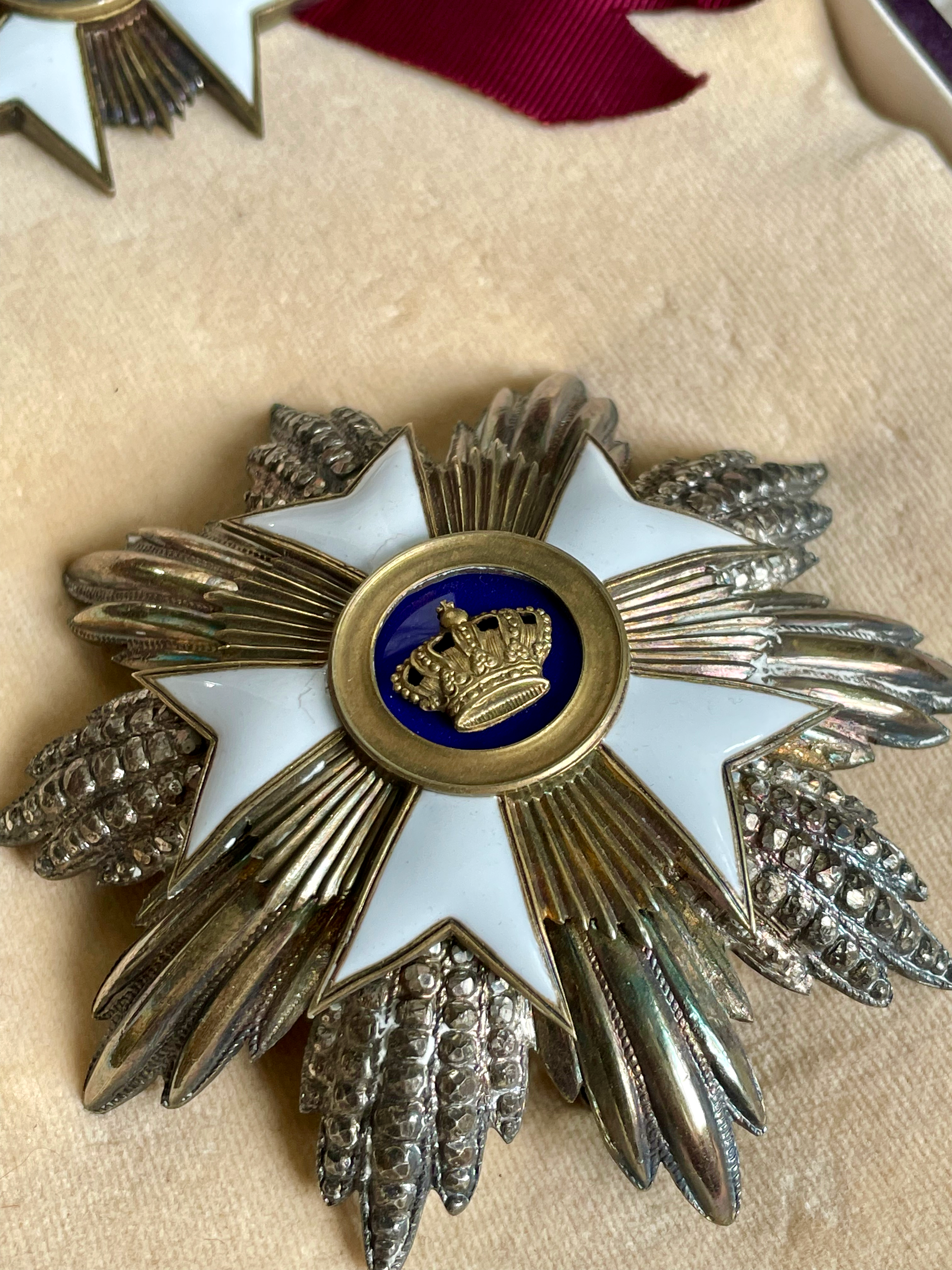
Grand Cross star.

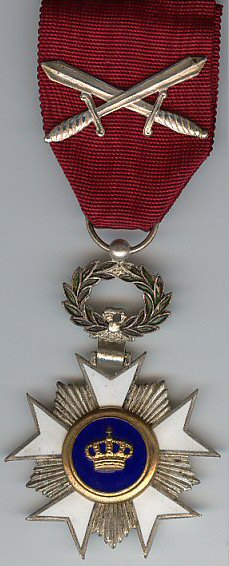
Knights Class with swords.

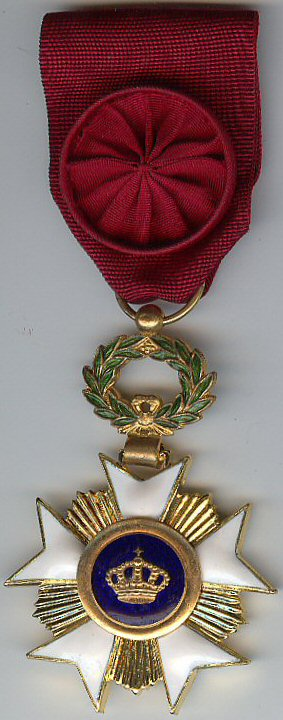
Officer Class.

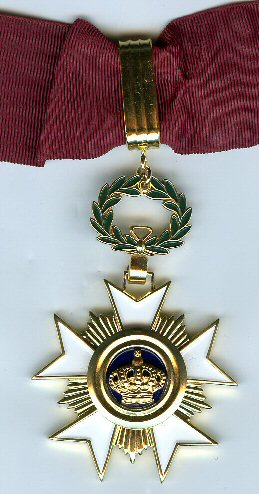
Commander Class.

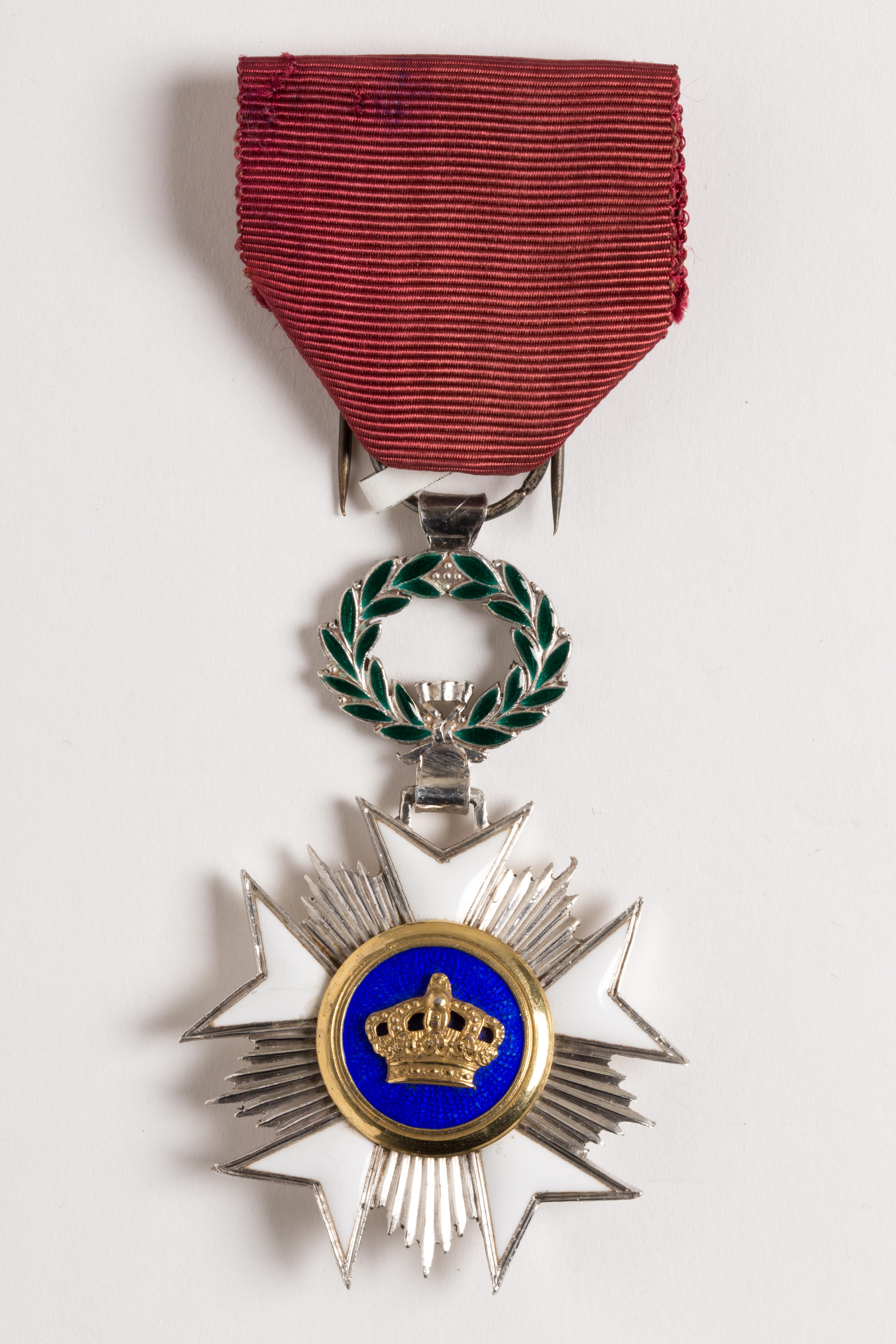
Knights Class (obverse)

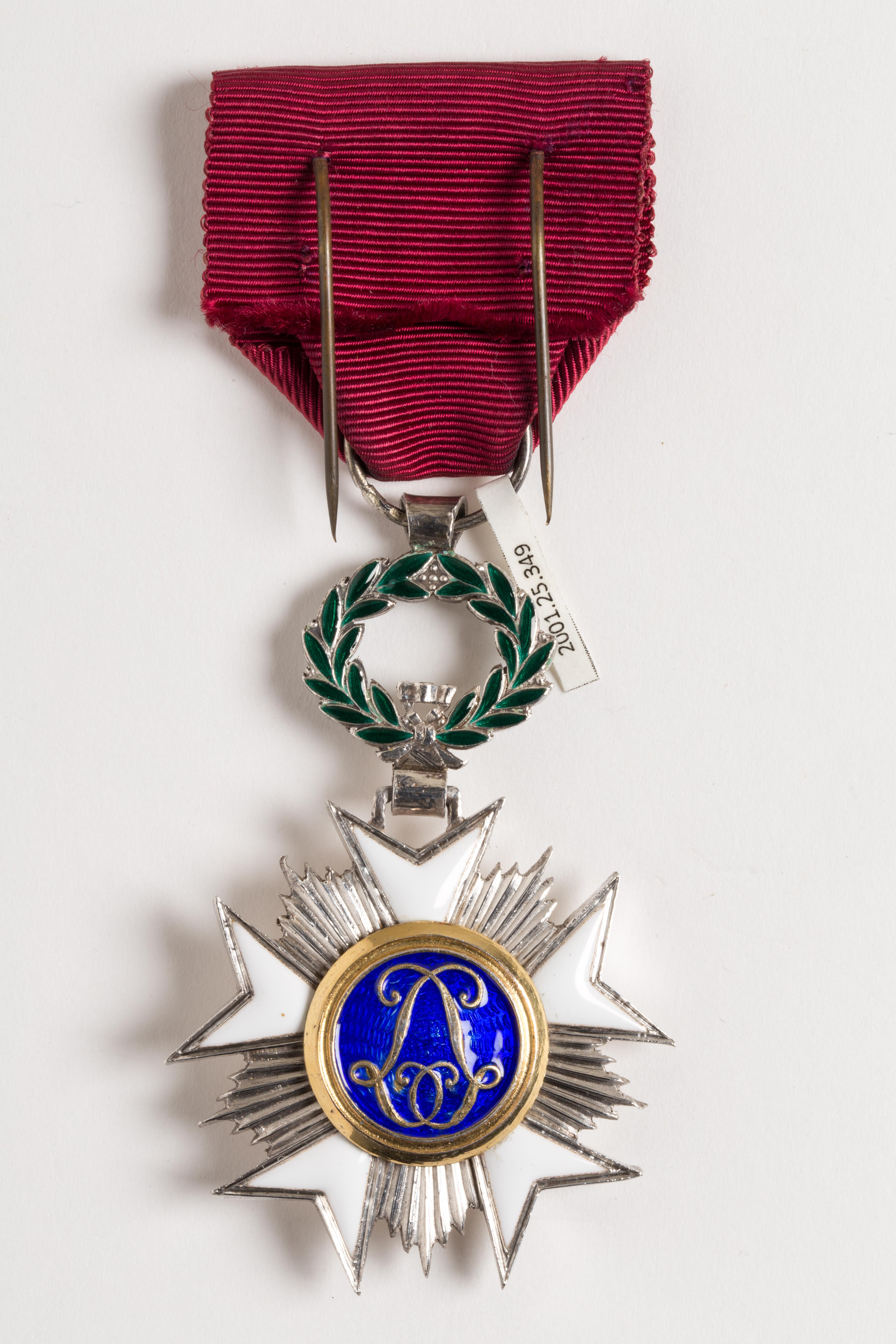
Knights Class (reverse)
