= Pine-Richland High School =

Coordinates: 40.659338°N 80.017017°W

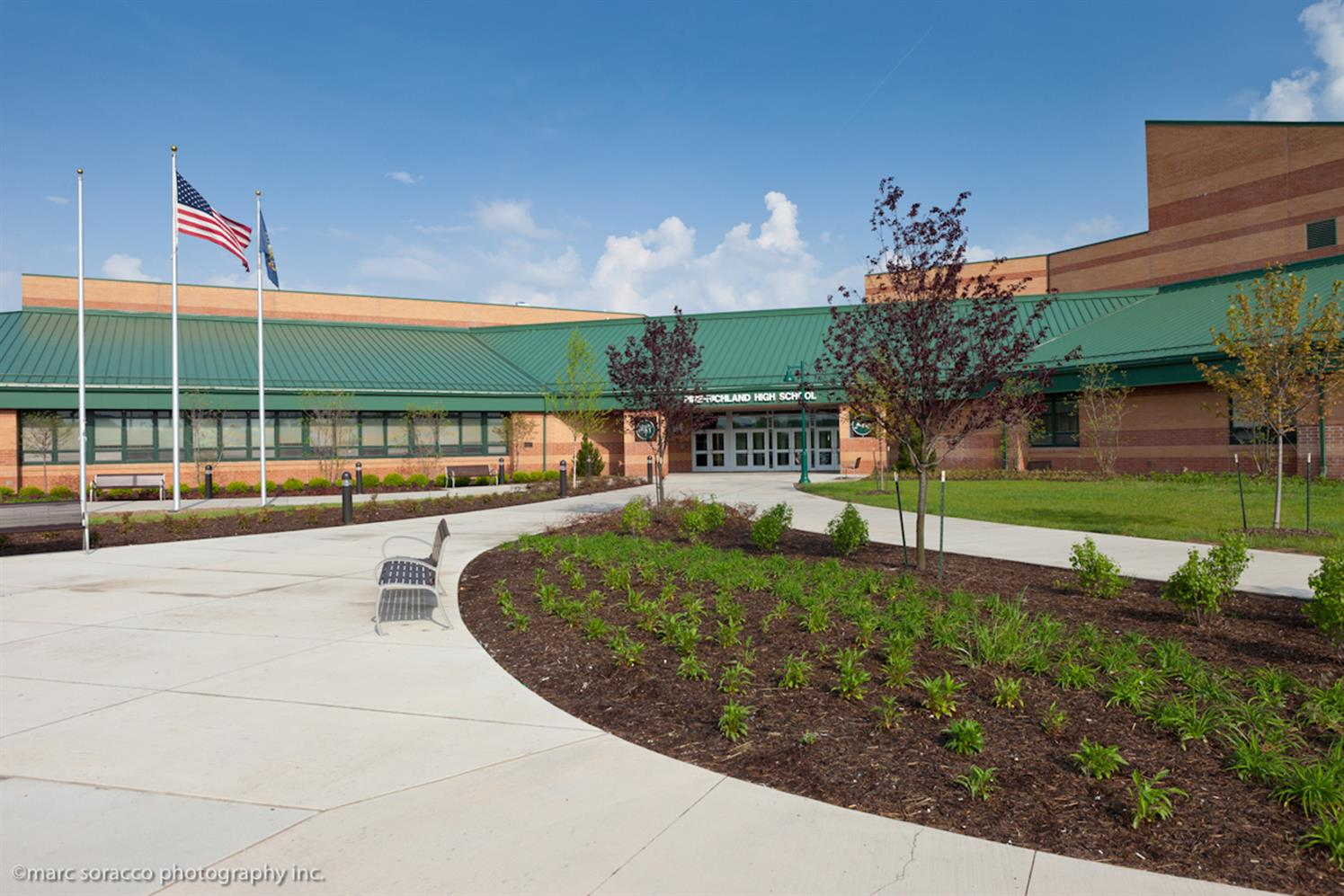
- 700 Warrendale Road; Gibsonia, Pennsylvania; 15044-6040; United States

Information
- Type: Public
- Established: 1993
- School district: Pine-Richland School District
- Principal: Frank Hernandez
- Teaching staff: 101.68 (FTE)
- Grades: 9–12
- Enrollment: 1,432 (2023–2024)
- Student to teacher ratio: 14.08
- Colors: Green and white
- Athletics conference: WPIAL section 6A
- Mascot: Rammy (Ram)
- Information: (724) 625-4444
- Website: PRHS

Pine-Richland High School is a large public high school located at 700 Warrendale Road in Gibsonia, Pennsylvania, United States. It is the only high school in the Pine-Richland School District and is located in Pine Township. For the 2024-2025 school year, the enrollment was 1,449 students

== History ==
In 1956, Richland High School opened; it allowed students transferred from other schools to spend the final two years of their public education at PRHS, along Baker's Town-Warrendale Road in Richland Township. The First class graduated in June 1958. The former building closed in 1993 and became Richland Elementary School in 1994. The newly constructed Pine-Richland High School took its place at 700 Warrendale Road in Pine Township.

The Pine-Richland Stadium was built on the new secondary campus between the middle school and the high school in 2001.

The current building opened in 1993, with one gymnasium, a pool, nearly 80 classrooms, office space, and a large auditorium. An addition opened in 2000 with modifications to the original building, plus nearly 30 more classrooms, a new gymnasium, and the new district office. In 2010, ground was broken to start expanding the school due to a growing population. The addition was completed in October 2012; it included a new STEAM wing, graphic design and art rooms, along with engineering rooms where students may elect to take classes on such topics. In 2021, an athletic field was constructed, "The Ram cage". In 2023, the school debuts a brand-new gymnasium, auxiliary gym, and fitness space. It is also recognized with the Excellence Award by the Mid-Atlantic Alliance for Performance Excellence program

== Academic Standings ==
Pine-Richland High School was ranked 5^{th} in Pittsburgh, 16^{th} in Pennsylvania, and 554th in the country as of 2026. For STEM-related rankings, the school ranks 355th among high schools in the United States. with 98% graduation rate and over 66% of students participate in AP courses. The school Keystone exams' proficiency grades were 77 in mathematics, 95 in reading and 87 in science.

- The PA State average keystone exam scores are 40 in mathematics, 60 in reading, and 50 in science

== Extracurriculars ==
The Pine-Richland School District offers a wide variety of clubs, activities and an extensive sports program.

The Pine-Richland offers a wide variety of clubs and activities Some being.

- Audio/Visual- PRTV
- Best Buddies
- Foreign Exchange Program
- Forensics
- Future Business Leaders of America
- Inkwell (literary Magazine)
- Key Club
- Model United Nations
- National Honor Society
- Peer-to-Peer
- Student Government
- Technology Student Association
- Tri-Rivers Fencing Club

Pine-Richland also offers a Junior Reserve Officers' Training Corps program

Pine-Richland offers a Junior Reserve Officers' Training Corps program that stresses honor and commitment, which mostly enforces rules of the armed forces, but does not encourage military enrollment.

== Arts ==
The annual Pine-Richland Art Show takes place at the beginning of May, showing portfolios of Advanced Placement art students and alumni.

The band course contains both a fall/winter marching band section and a later year ensemble experience. The Pine-Richland Rams Marching Band has a yearly repertoire consisting of an "opener," a tuba feature, a band dance (during which the drumline is featured), a colorguard feature, a dance team feature, a closer, and various other songs. The second part of the band course, the ensemble band, focuses on musical ability. Jazz Ensemble provides a venue where well-performing students can play jazz and blues music. Each year the school features a musical for which students must try out, including music from a selected pit orchestra.

The school competes at the Gene Kelly Awards each year, an award ceremony for local high schools in the greater Pittsburgh area.

The school has a chapter of the International Thespian Society. Each fall, the club sponsors a fall production.

Pine-Richland has a video production program that is offered to all grades.

== Sports ==
The Pine-Richland High School's mascot is the Ram. The Rams baseball, girls soccer, hockey, gymnastics, and volleyball teams were all state champions in the 2005–2006 school year. There were five state championship teams in 2006: girls volleyball, girls soccer, baseball, boys tennis doubles, and gymnastics. In 2005 the girls soccer team defeated the number one ranked team in the nation to win their first PIAA state title. In 2006, the Pine-Richland wrestling team were section champions. Pine-Richland's competition cheerleading team was 3rd in the nation in the 2012–2013 school year. In November 2014, the football team won the AAAA WPIAL Championship against defending champion Pittsburgh Central Catholic.

== Pine-Richland Football Program ==
Pine-Richland High School football program has consistently ranked as a 5A championship contender in Pennsylvania. Over 12 years, Pine-Richland has consistently fought for its 1^{st} place position in WPIAL class 5A. Led by coach Jon Ledonne, who previously coached the Penn Hills football program to a streak of 46-13 over 5 years. The Pine-Richland Football team in the 2025 season finished with a record of 11-2 and a WPIAL Class 5A runner-up. The school currently stands with 9 WPIAL titles and 3 State titles.

=== Notable Game ===
Pine-Richland High School On August 24^{th}, 2018, played IMG Academy as an official game of there season, it served as a major moment in Pine-Richland's football history, despite a large loss of 42-0. Hosting IMG Academy, known for its dominance in high school sports, Put Pine-Richland on the national stage.

The match was significant, Pine-Richland won the State Championship the previous year; the Rams demonstrated their ability to compete at a national level. The game attracted attention across the nation, putting a spotlight to Pine-Richland's program and showcasing the performance of its players to compete at the highest level. It served as turning point in the Schools Football Program.

Varsity

Boys

- Baseball – AAAAA
- Basketball – AAAAA
- Cross country – AAA
- Football – AAAAA
- Golf – AAAA
- Ice hockey – AAA
- Lacrosse – AAAA
- Soccer – AAA
- Swimming and diving – AAA
- Tennis – AAA
- Track and field – AAA
- Volleyball – AAA
- Wrestling – AAA

Girls

- Basketball – AAAA
- Cheer – AAAA
- Cross country – AAA
- Field hockey – AAA
- Golf – AAA
- Gymnastics – AAAA
- Lacrosse – AAAA
- Soccer (fall) – AAA
- Softball – AAAA
- Swimming and diving – AAA
- Tennis – AAA
- Track and field – AAA
- Volleyball – AAA

== Lip dub ==
In 2014, Pine-Richland High School saw viral success with their lip dub of American Authors' song "Best Day of my Life." It was featured on local news outlets and seen across the world on Yahoo! Sports. As of March 2025 the video had 490,923 views on YouTube.

== Notable alumni ==
- Jeff Calhoun (1978) – Tony Award-winning choreographer
- Stephen Frick (1982) – astronaut
- Blake Lalli (2001) – Former Major league baseball player, Current Manager of the Reno Aces
- Kevin McCabe (2003) – football player
- Neil Walker (2004) – Former Major League Baseball player
- Meghan Klingenberg (2007) – midfielder for the Houston Dash and the United States women's national soccer team
- Vinny Nittoli (2010) – MLB player
- Brandon Saad (2011) – Professional ice hockey player
- Ben DiNucci (2015) - Retired NFL Player
- Jackie Evancho (2018), singer
- Phil Jurkovec (2018) - Quarterback for Pittsburgh Panthers
- Mike Katic (2019) – former college football player and Barstool Sports personality
- Levi Wentz (2020) – NFL wide receiver
- Jeremiah Hasley (2022) – college football tight end for the Duke Blue Devils
- Jay Timmons (2026) – college football cornerback for the Ohio State Buckeyes
