= Andor Thoma =

Hungarian anthropologist

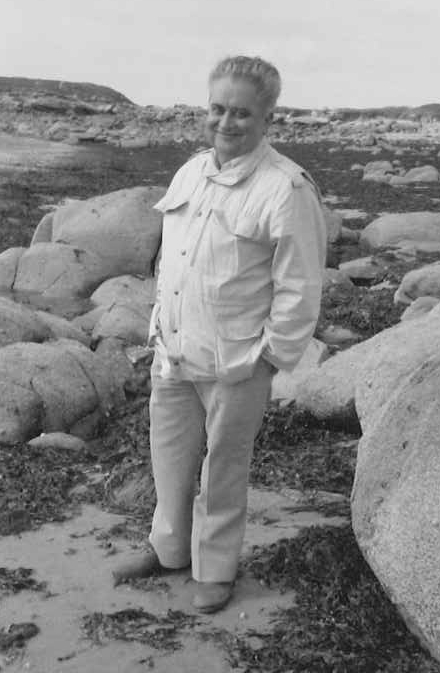
- Andor Thoma in 1984
- Born: 1928; Magyaróvár, Hungary
- Died: 2003 (aged 74–75); Paris
- Resting place: Budakeszi
- Citizenship: Belgium
- Occupation: Anthropologist

Andor Thoma (November 30, 1928, Magyaróvár – May 31, 2003, Paris) was a Hungarian anthropologist. His studies focused on the evolution of Paleolithic hominids. Some of his major works were the examination of the dentition of the Subalyuk Neanderthal child, of the Vértesszőlős finds and of Palestinian fossils.
