= Western Pennsylvania Model Railroad Museum =

Railroad museum in Gibsonia, Pennsylvania

Coordinates: 40.6310°N 79.9729°W

The Western Pennsylvania Model Railroad Museum is a railroad museum in Gibsonia, Pennsylvania, US.

It is dedicated to the exhibition of model trains and historical railroad paraphernalia. The museum's main exhibit is a 40' by 100' scale model of the railroad lines connecting Pittsburgh, Pennsylvania and Cumberland, Maryland, accompanied by information on the history of the route and the technical details of its construction.

Other facilities include a children's area, a gift shop, a snack bar, and a newsagent.

From November to January the museum runs a holiday train show.
