= Vértesszőlős =

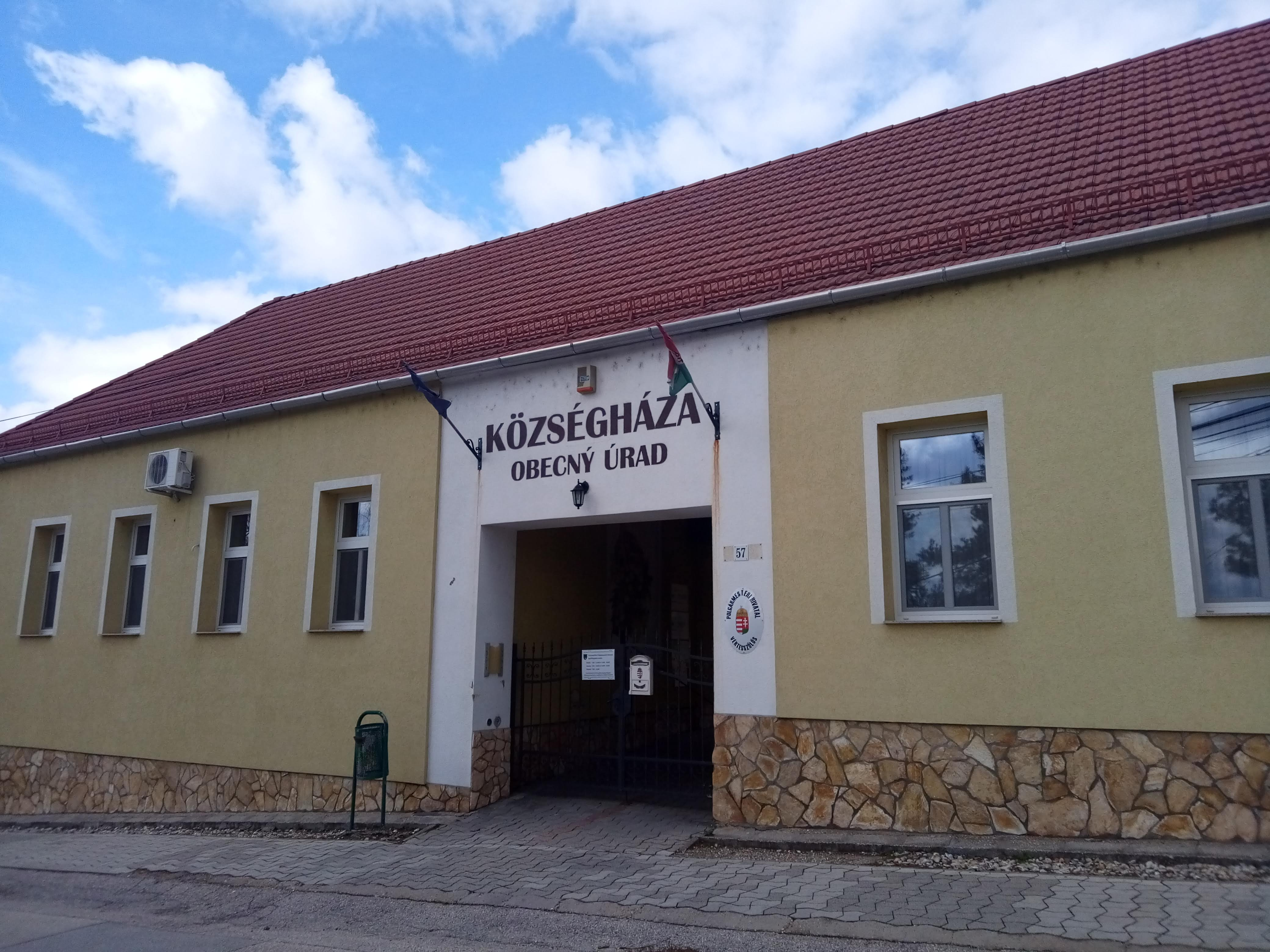
- Village hall

- Flag Coat of arms

- Location of Vértesszőlős
- Coordinates: 47.61884°N 18.38030°E
- Country: Hungary
- County: Komárom-Esztergom

Area
  - Total: 17.12 km^{2} (6.61 sq mi)

Population (2004)
  - Total: 3,120
  - Density: 182/km^{2} (472/sq mi)
- Time zone: UTC+1 (CET)
  - Summer (DST): UTC+2 (CEST)
- Postal code: 2837
- Area code: 34
- Motorways: M1
- Distance from Budapest: 63.8 km (39.6 mi) East

Vértesszőlős is a village in Komárom-Esztergom county, Hungary. It is most known for the archaeological site where a Middle Pleistocene human fossil, known as "Samu", was found.

== History ==
=== Prehistory ===
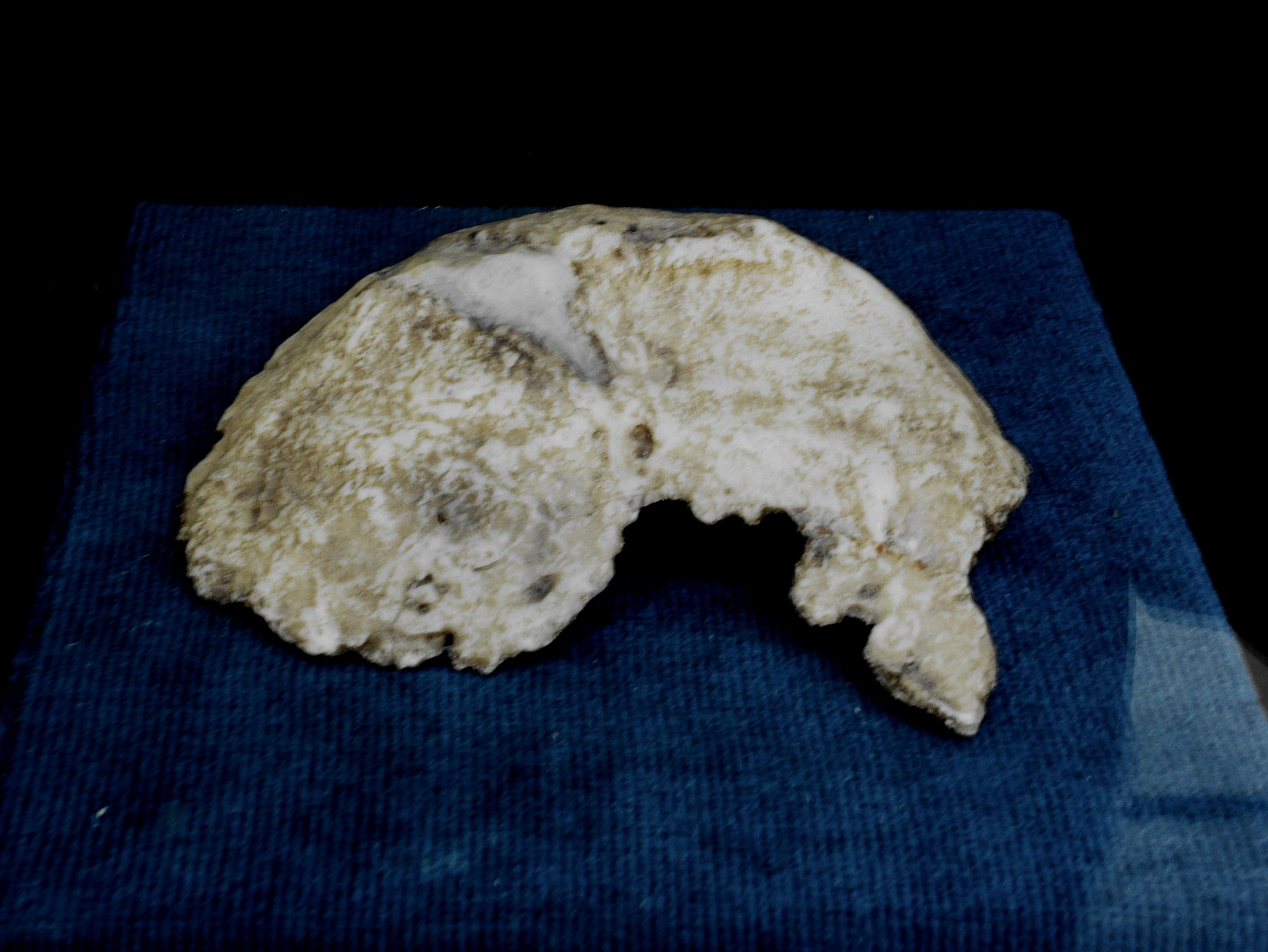
Samu

Vértesszőlős sits at the foot of the Gerecse Mountains, which were at one point in the sea. At the bottom of this sea, many fossils accumulated, including that of a Homo heidelbergensis individual that is now known as Samu.

=== Modern history ===
For most of its history, Vértesszőlős has been constantly inhabited by different peoples, including Celts, Romans, Avars, Moravians, and Hungarians. According to legend, it was near Vértesszőlős that Svatopluk I of Moravia and Árpád fought.

At the beginning of the 18th century, the village had several Lords, who recruited Slovak-speaking serfs to settle the land. These settlers radically transformed the landscape; they drained the marshes, cut forests to make pastures, and brought sheep into the territory. By the end of the 18th century, the Slovak settlers decided to build a church, which was completed in 1792.

In 1809, Napoleon's armies invaded Hungary, and ramparts were built in Vértesszőlős.

In World War I, 236 inhabitants of the village fought, of which 32 died and 7 became disabled. In 1929, the names of the dead were recorded on the Hero Memorial which stands in front of the village's church. This was also the year that the village's school was built.

In World War II, 23 soldiers from the village died. The front passed through the village twice, causing many buildings to be damaged. In 1944, the parish priest of the village died, and the pastor died a year later in January 1945. It wasn't until March 1945 that the Soviet forces displaced the German occupants from Vértesszőlős.

Between 1990 and 1994 the town grew with several newly built public institutions: a sports hall, a football field, a new school building, a health house, and a pharmacy had been built. After Hungary joined the European Union in 2004, from 2006 onwards, the EU development funds, more significant than the previous ones, provided new impetus to the development of Vértesszőlős.
