= Deer Lakes School District =

School district in Pennsylvania

Address
- 21 East Union Road Cheswick, Pennsylvania, Allegheny, 15024; United States

District information
- Type: Public
- Grades: K-12
- Schools: 4
- Budget: $36.2 million (2021–22)

Students and staff
- Students: 1754 (2022–23)
- Teachers: 132.15 (on an FTE basis) {2022–23)
- Staff: 246.15(on an FTE basis)(2022–23)
- Student–teacher ratio: 13.37
- District mascot: Lancers
- Colors: Green and gold

Other information
- Website: www.deerlakes.net

The Deer Lakes School District is a small, suburban, K-12 public school district near Pittsburgh which covers East Deer, Frazer, and West Deer townships in Allegheny County, Pennsylvania. Deer Lakes School District encompasses approximately 41 square miles. According to 2020 federal census data, it serves a resident population of 14,913 people with a median family income of $82,862.

The district operates four schools: Curtisville Primary Center (K-2nd), East Union Intermediate Center (3rd-5th), Deer Lakes Middle School (6th–8th) and Deer Lakes High School (9th–12th).

== See also ==
- List of school districts in Pennsylvania
