= Charles Reizenstein Company =

American glassware and chinaware company

- Founded: 1865 in Allegheny, Pennsylvania
- Founder: Charles Reizenstein
- Headquarters: Allegheny, Pennsylvania
- Area served: Worldwide
- Key people: Louis Reizenstein
- Products: Fine Glassware

The Charles Reizenstein Company was an internationally acclaimed glassware and chinaware designer, importer, and manufacturer. The company's first store was established on Federal Street in Allegheny (now Pittsburgh) in 1865, making it America's oldest family-owned china and glassware concern as of 1947.

== Company history ==
Israel Reizenstein (c. 1830–1898), a Bavarian Jew, immigrated to New York City circa 1849. Once in America, he changed his first name to Charles. In 1851, he wed Rose Streng (c. 1825–1902), who had also been born in Bavaria and had come to the United States circa 1851.

Charles was working as a sugar maker when the Civil War broke out, and he volunteered with the Union Army on April 19, 1861, shortly after the Confederate attack on Fort Sumter. He was soon discharged due to suffering from rheumatism, but he re-enlisted with the 6th Regiment of the New York State Militia and served from November 1863 through May 1864. Documents regarding his military service show his surname spelled variously as Reizenstein, Reitzenstein, and Reicenstein, probably due to copyists' errors.

After the war ended in 1865, Charles sold glass lamps in Franklin, Pennsylvania, for a short time, but by 1866, the family had relocated to old Allegheny. There Charles, with his son Louis, established a store in Federal Street, just north of the "old hay market." The company, which became known as C. Reizenstein and Sons, served an exclusive clientele and imported glass and china ware from Europe, including hand-painted wares from Limoges, France, and Saxony. Charles made yearly sea voyages to Europe to acquire fine glass and china, and many of the china ware pieces he imported were marked with the "C. Reizenstein" name in addition to the manufacturer's logotype as part of their back stamps.

In 1882, Louis Reizenstein married Freda Jacobs (c. 1857–1922), who had been born in Marietta, Ohio. Beginning that same year, Louis took a more active role in the company. He carried on the family tradition of maintaining personal contact with European manufacturers and suppliers, making 48 transatlantic trips during his 50-year career with the firm, and visiting most of the major European cities to do business in glass and china wares. In 1927 King Albert of Belgium made him a Chevalier the Order of the Crown for his services to the china ware industry in Liège. He was said to be "the first commercial man to receive this honor."

The Reizenstein family was deeply involved in the social reform movement, and the family business was used as a means of acquiring funds for distribution through philanthropic scholarship and civil rights organizations in Pennsylvania and nationwide.

== Notable family members ==
Charles (Israel) Reizenstein (circa 1830–1898)

- Founder of the Charles Reizenstein Company
- Wife: Rosa Streng Reizenstein
- Historic Residence: 52 Fremont/1534 Fremont/Brighton Pl
- Children: Julius, Caroline, Louis, Isadore, Rachel, Samuel, Sophie, Henrietta

Louis Reizenstein (1856–1947)

- President of the company for 50 years, Louis was an internationally known glass and china authority
- Wife: Frieda Jacobs Reizenstein (c. 1857–1922)
- Parents: Charles (Israel) Reizenstein and Rosa Streng Reizenstein
- Children: Louis J. Reizenstein, Harry Samuel Reizenstein, Elrose Reizenstein Silverman, Charles L. Reizenstein
- Grandchildren: Louis P. Reizenstein, Harry S. Reizenstein Jr.
- Great Grand children: David Reizenstein, Richard Reizenstein

Elrose Reizenstein Silverman (1883–1976)

- Husband: Alexander Silverman, the brother of Freda Silverman Reizenstein
- Parents: Louis Reizenstein and Freda Reizenstein
- Elrose was childless and so, as she told an interviewer in 1958, she "had to do something for somebody else's children." She devoted herself to the promotion of education by supporting the efforts of the Allegheny County Scholarship Association and the scholarship programs of the National Council of Jewish Women. In 1959 the Elrose Reizenstein Silverman Scholarship was established in her name by the Alpha Epsilon Phi Mothers' Club at the University of Pittsburgh. Hers is also the name that was honored in the creation of the family's subsidiary, the Elrose Decorating Company. She and her husband Alexander collected modern glass and they donated their vast holdings to Alfred University in western New York state.

Charles L. Reizenstein (1884–1961)

- Wife: Freda Silverman, the sister of Alexander Silverman
- Parents: Charles (Israel) Reizenstein and Rosa Streng Reizenstein
- Children: Charlotte and Louis
- In early 1915, a group of immigrant Bohemian glass workers approached Charles L. in hopes of employment; he hired them and formed the Elrose Decorating Company to craft and market Bohemian-style glassware made in the United States. This subsidiary company was named for his sister Elrose.

Freda Silverman Reizenstein (circa 1887–1946)

- Husband: Charles L. Reizenstein
- Children: Charlotte and Louis
- Freda's philanthropic activities included serving as the president of the Pittsburgh Conference of Jewish Women's Organizations. She edited a regular page on club news for the American Jewish Outlook and was also active in the Women's International League for Peace and Freedom.

Louis J. Reizenstein (c. 1896–1977)

- Son of Louis and Freda Reizenstein
- Husband of Florence Silberstein Reizenstein
- Louis J. first intended to become a rabbi, but took up a career as a chemist instead. He did not join the family's glass company, but in 1923, he and three other associates formed The Falk Company, which dealt in the refining of resins and oils; the company was sold to Cargill in 1947, making Louis J. quite wealthy. In 1955, he was named president of the newly-formed United Jewish Federation. "I was the only guy nobody was mad at," he quipped.

Florence Silberstein Reizenstein (1901–1970)

- Wife of Louis J. Reizenstein
- Child: David Louis Reizenstein
- Florence Reizenstein dedicated her life to the improvement of race and interfaith relations; her list of services to the community included membership in both state and city human relations commissions, the NAACP, the National Conference of Christians and Jews, the Urban League (where she co-founded the Negro Educational Emergency Drive, or NEED, which has distributed hundreds of scholarships over the years), the Anti-Defamation League, and Women in Urban Crisis. In 1975 the Florence Reizenstein elementary school on Penn Avenue in East Liberty was named in her honor. from 2008 - 2011 it housed the Schenley Middle School and High School; it was subsequently renamed for Barack Obama and was demolished in 2013.
- Grandson: Philip Reizenstein, attorney in Florida
