= Pine-Richland School District =

School district in Pennsylvania, US

Location
- 702 Warrendale Road Pittsburgh, Pennsylvania, (Allegheny County); United States

District information
- Type: Public school
- Grades: K-12
- Established: 1958
- Superintendent: Brian Miller
- Schools: Pine-Richland High School, Pine-Richland Middle School, Eden Hall Upper Elementary School, Hance Elementary School, Richland Elementary School, Wexford Elementary School

Students and staff
- District mascot: Ram
- Colors: Green, white

Other information
- Website: www.pinerichland.org

The Pine-Richland School District is a mid-sized, suburban public school district serving northern Pittsburgh in Allegheny County, Pennsylvania. Pine-Richland School District encompasses approximately 31 square miles (80 km^{2}) serving residents of Pine Township and of Richland Township.

In 2010, the US Census Bureau reported an increased population to 22,601 people. According to 2000 federal census data, the district's resident population was 16,914 people. In 2009, the district residents' per capita income was $29,680, while the median family income was $75,982. In the Commonwealth, the median family income was $49,501 and the United States median family income was $49,445, in 2010.

Pine-Richland School District operates three primary schools for grades K-3: Wexford Elementary School, Hance Elementary School and Richland Elementary School. The district operates Eden Hall Upper Elementary School for grades 4–6; Pine-Richland Middle School for grades 7–8, and Pine-Richland High School for grades 9–12.

Pine-Richland High school students may choose to attend A. W. Beattie Career Center for vocational training. The Allegheny Intermediate Unit IU3 provides the district with a wide variety of services like specialized education for disabled students and hearing, speech and visual disability services and professional development for staff and faculty.

The Mid-Atlantic Alliance for Performance Excellence (MAAPE) program named Pine-Richland School District a 2021 Excellence Award recipient. The Excellence Award is the alliance's highest award level. The district is only the seventh organization to earn the Excellence Award in the past 15 years and the first education sector excellence award recipient.

== History ==
Pine-Richland was first known as the Pine Richland Joint School District in 1958. It was then changed to Babcock School District in 1971 in honor of the Babcock family who donated land to the school district. In the fall of 1982 the name was changed to the current name of Pine-Richland School District.

== Extracurriculars ==
The district offers a wide variety of clubs, activities and an extensive sports program.

=== Sports ===
The district funds:

Varsity

Boys

- Baseball - AAAA
- Basketball- AAAA
- Cross country - AAA
- Football - AAAAA
- Golf - AAA
- Ice hockey - club
- In-line hockey - club
- Lacrosse - AAAA
- Soccer - AAA
- Swimming and diving - AAA
- Tennis - AAA
- Track and field - AAA
- Volleyball - AAA
- Wrestling - AAA
- Crew (Rowing) - Club

Girls

- Basketball - AAAA
- Cheer - AAAA
- Cross country - AAA
- Field hockey - AAA
- Golf - AAA
- Gymnastics - AAAA
- Lacrosse - AAAA
- Soccer - AAA
- Softball - AAAA
- Swimming and diving - AAA
- Tennis - AAA
- Track and field - AAA
- Volleyball - AAA
- Crew (rowing) - Club

Middle school sports

Boys

- Baseball
- Basketball
- Cross country
- Football
- Soccer
- Track and field
- Wrestling
- Crew

Girls

- Basketball
- Cross country
- Field hockey
- Lacrosse
- Soccer
- Softball
- Track and field
- Volleyball
- Crew

According to PIAA directory July 2013
