= Samu (fossil) =

Hominin fossil

Coordinates: 47.627°N 18.384°E

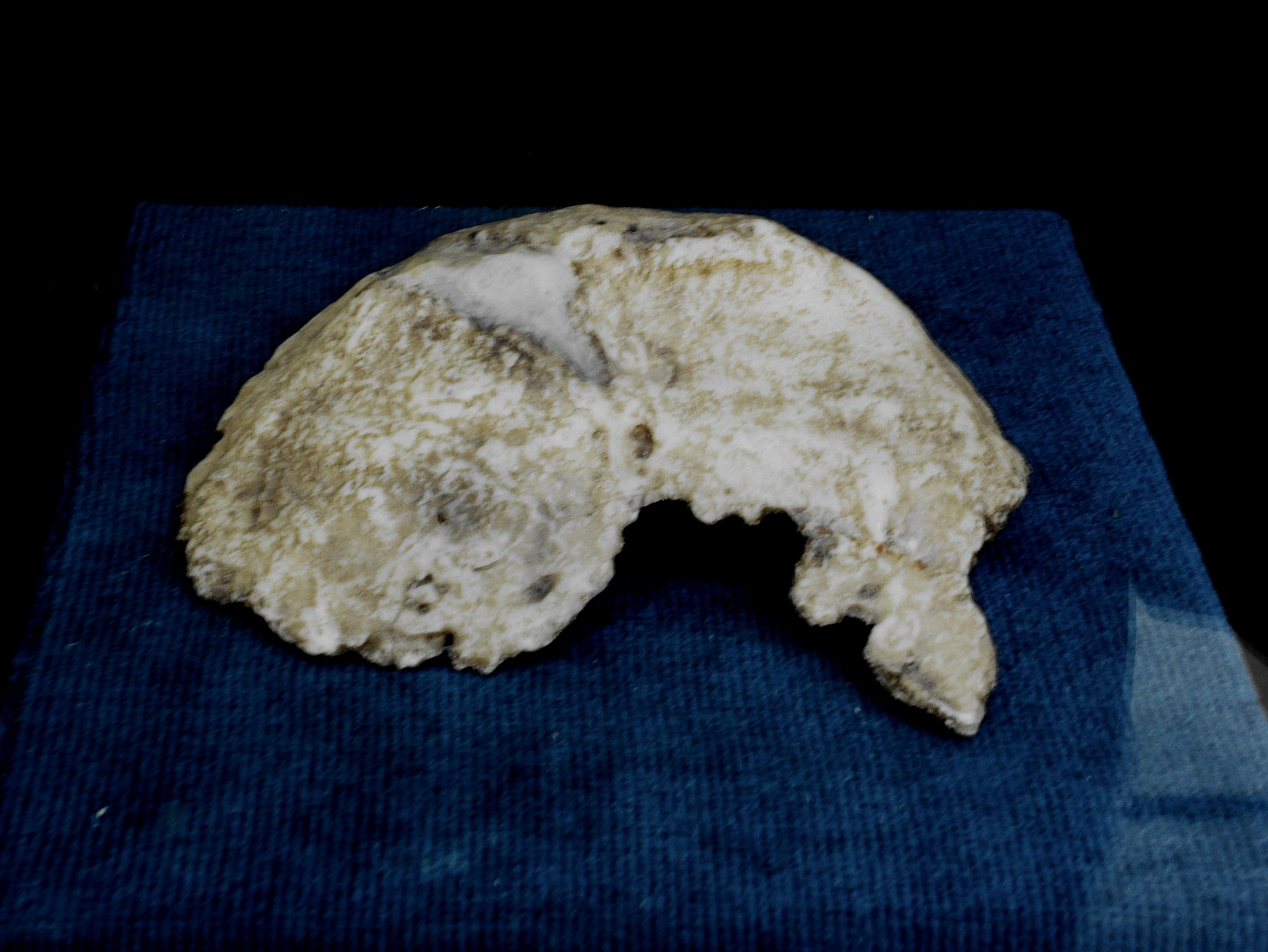
- The bone, situated opposite its life position.
- Catalog no.: VSZ I-II
- Common name: Samu
- Species: Homo neanderthalensis? Homo heidelbergensis
- Age: 325-340 ka
- Place discovered: Vértesszőlős Early Man Site, Hungary
- Date discovered: 21 August 1965
- Discovered by: László Vértes and team

Samu (VSZ II) is the nickname given to a fragmentary Middle Pleistocene human occipital, also known as Vértesszőlős Man or Vértesszőlős occipital, discovered in Vértesszőlős, Central Transdanubia, Hungary.

== Discovery ==
The find was made on August 21,1965 during a dig led by László Vértes in the small village of Vértesszőlős, and the fossil was nicknamed Sámuel, because the twenty-first of August is the name day of biblical judge Samuel in Hungarian tradition. Since, the fossil has widely become known as Samu, a short form of the name in Hungary. The site has garnered much scientific interest due to an abundance of faunal remains during quarrying.

At the same time as the occipital, 'several lower' milk teeth were discovered 8 meters from the cranium, found close in relation to the Zhoukoudian hominins, and catalogued VSZ I. At first, the remains were believed to be of 500 ka, but recent revisions suggest a younger antiquity of 300-250 ka. Additional dating work clarifies an age of 315±72 ka for the fossil, 310±30 ka for the footprint, and 328±28 ka for the oldest human occupation. An alternative dating scheme is 210-185 ka.

A replica of the Samu occipital bone is on exhibit in the Hungarian National Museum, as well as associated tools and fossilized animal footprints. Since discovery, the occipital has drawn great tourist attraction and scientific interest. "Samu" has become a common name for plastic skeletons shown in biology classes in Hungarian student slang.

=== Vandalism scandal ===

The village flag and coat of arms bears the face of Samu.

In 2009, news sources claimed that a 14 year-old girl vandalized hominin material from the site and local elementary school children broke into the excavation area, marking up the walls and trampling faunal fossils. However, it was also stated by officials that no serious damage, aside from several broken bones, was caused by this, and the site remains valuable as no important finds could be accessed. Originally, it was reported that the girl has opened the exhibition space of the local with a key, scribbling rock band names on the windows and display cases sometime from January 28 to February 4, when the museum was closed and unable to be checked on. The damage was discovered by staff during weekly double inspections. The individual allegedly 'partially' admitted to guilt, and police started proceedings despite knowing if there were any other perpetrators. It was determined that the girl's house key was able to unlock the museum doors. However, later reports found that the original Samu fossil was housed in the Hungarian National Museum, not the museum that was vandalized, meaning that the original fossil was not damaged.

== Description ==
The occipital fragment probably belonged to an adult individual, but it is very thin and flattened at the top-rear. The nuchal hump is very developed and, in life, would have supported very robust neck musculature. The cranial capacity was initially estimated to be 1300 cc. The fragment has been distorted during fossilization within the travertine. Vértes hypothesized that traces of brain extraction and cannibalism are present on the bone, although this is typically rejected. Later morphological analysis by Roksandic, Radović, and Lindal (2018) clarify that the revised cranial capacity is 'large', but do not list a metric.

The nuchal and occipital planes have a sharp angle. The occipital torus is moderately wide, and a deep sulcus that is somewhat continuous along the superior nuchal line makes this formation pronounced. A suprainiac depression is either not found above it, or, like Bilzingsleben, it is not preserved in the fossil as it sits high and starts with the opisthocranion. The incipient suprainiac fossa is a derived Neanderthal trait, but the broad ramus with small distance to the M3, thick and angled occipital, high inion, and occipital torus morphology are basal Homo erectus traits.

== Classification ==
The fossil was first described as Homo erectus (seu sapiens) paleohungaricus by Hungarian anthropologist Andor Thoma in 1996. Thoma was not sure what species his subspecies should belong to, seu being a Latin term meaning "either" or "or", suggesting that either H. sapiens paleohungaricus or H. erectus paleohungaricus may be potentially valid as a late specimen of H. erectus or an early H. sapiens. Because the fossil is very fragmentary, the classification of the find has since been controversial. Vértes suggested that it was a Homo erectus, as did Phillip Tobias. However, Tobias disagreed in the estimated cranial volume of 1300 cc. Of the many scientists who examined Samu, Wolpoff concluded that the bone was relatively nondiagnostic in that it could not be conclusively generalized from its preservation and taphonomic damage.

Others remained divided by the apparently large volume and Neanderthal-like traits (which drew criticism, as the nuchal region of Samu is unlike Neanderthals). Stringer first classified the fragment as a late-surviving preneanderthal, a term that describes specimens typically assigned to Homo heidelbergensis with Neanderthal affinities. Others such as Adams (1999) suggest that the population is transitional of Homo erectus and Homo sapiens. Later discoveries, such as the Petralona skull, compare well in the occipital wall and Soukup and Mechurová (2018) support assignment to Homo heidelbergensis.

Roksandic, Radović, and Lindal (2018) suggest that the specimen is alike to Castel di Guido, Arago, Bilzingsleben, and Petralona in the suite of basal Homo erectus traits with few derived Neanderthal traits. They raise the possibility that a restricted Homo heidelbergensis definition might include this specimen, and definitely includes Mauer, Ceprano, Visogliano, Balanica, Hazorea, and Nadaouiyeh Aïn Askar as a group close to the human-Neanderthal split. However, they did not include the specimen in their Homo bodoensis like they did with many of the other specimens mentioned in their 2018 study, a taxon which is considered a junior synonym of Homo rhodesiensis. Other recent classifications suggest they were 'archaic' Neanderthals. A paper submitted to a conference uses Homo erectus hungaricus as an alternate name.

== Technology ==
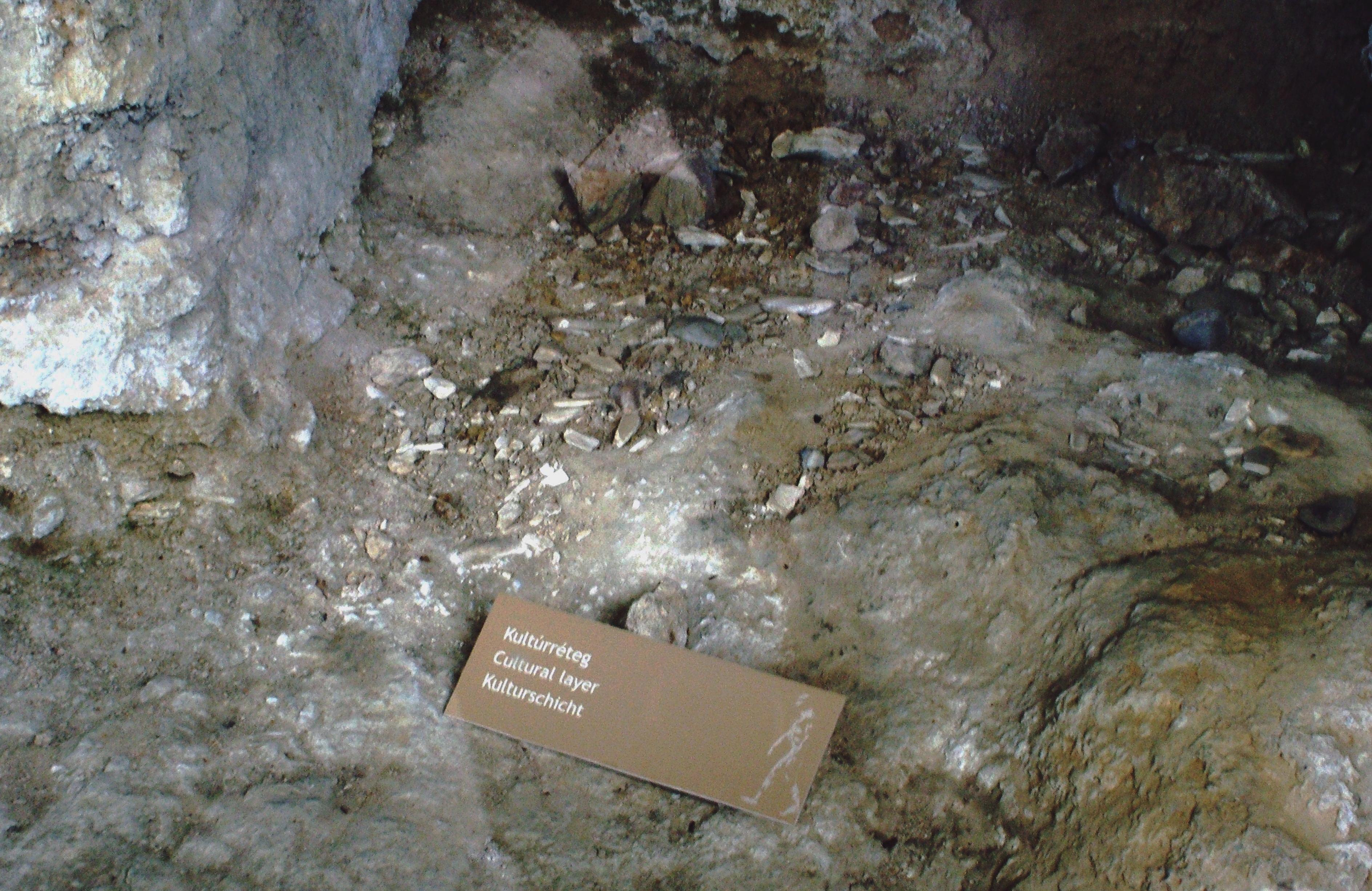
Human cultural layer from the site.

In 1966, István Skoflek discovered evidence of fire and charred animal bones dating to 350 ka probably belonging to a hunting camp. The bones were found within the fire, and were probably used to keep the fire alive. Alongside the bone fragments was a charcoal layer around 5 cm thick and spanning around 7 meters in width. The site also provides a stone tool industry characterized by cutting tools with chipping and distinctive microlithic character that were constructed from quartz, quartzite cobbles, or silex. Both this site and Bilzingsleben are alike in their lack of handaxes and dominance of flakes. These raw materials, from carefully selected boulders that were split, were probably retrieved from the silts and sediments around the river. The average implement is 2.4 cm in length, and the humans at this site used these for cutting, carving, leatherworking, and wood manufacturing to produce spears and other items. These activities left 'production waste' important in studying their use and evolution.

=== Diet ===
As the site becomes less ancient, the technology becomes more advanced in their manufacturing. As well, a bone culture was identified and similar to the stone tools in production. Other bones bore traces of marrow extraction and meat trimming. The area was abundant in food, and the ancient people hunted herbivores of various sizes and predators alike. Skeletal evidence suggests that horses were the most common food item, but aurochs, bison (such as Bison schoetensacki), deer, wolves, and roe as well as bear fossils were discovered, although it is undetermined if the bears were hunted or brought by people from another location. Animals that died of non-human causes are present as well.

== Paleoecology ==
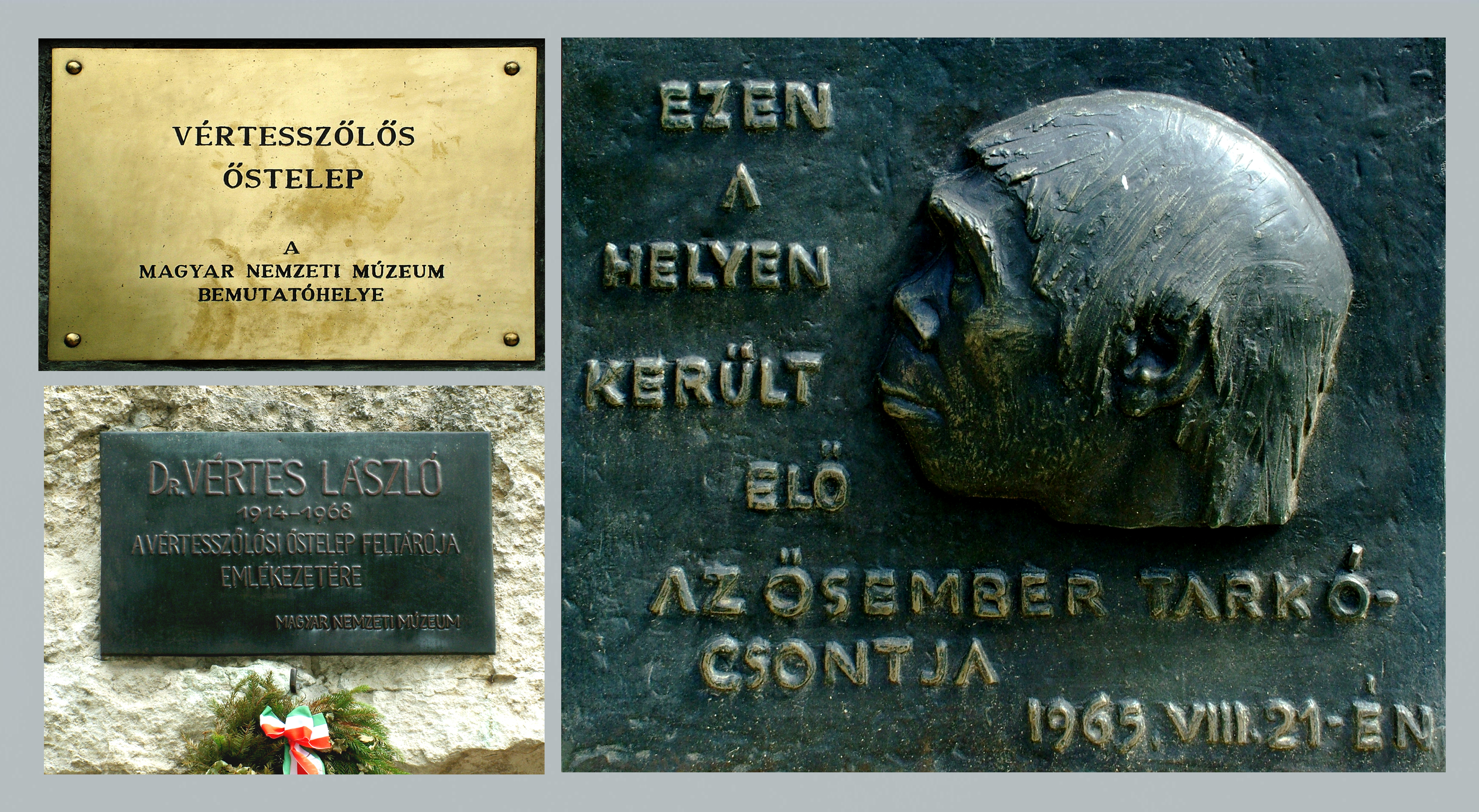
Sign at the archeological site denoting the finding of the occipital.

The town of Vértesszőlős is located in the northern section of the Pannonian Plains of the Gerecse Mountains foothills. The fossil itself was exhumed from the Által-ér, a river that stretches 51 km and consists of 4-5 travertine terraces made of calcite. The fossils found by the river are very well preserved. Human occupation at the site exists in two settlements aged 400-200 ka (during the Mindel glaciation; the second ice age). During this time, the climate was milder and warmer, and in January temperatures probably did on, on average, extend under 37.4 °F (3 °C). Human fossils and culture can be found in several layers of sediment, such as cut animal bones and even a human footprint. The hominins lived in an area that was mid-mountainous at the western foot of a mountain with open calcareous tuff or freshwater limestone pools on the verge of what once was a thermal lake, which is consistent with other Neanderthal populations^{a}. The site was once a dense temperate seasonal forest. Rhinoceros like Stephanorhinus etruscus were also contemporaries with aurochs, bison, deer, wolves, and roe.

== Notes ==
1. The author of this study agrees with the classification of the Vértesszőlős fossils as early Neanderthals, but those such as Roksandic et al. suggest affinities with specimens typically assigned to Homo rhodesiensis or Homo heidelbergensis.
