= List of state routes in Allegheny County, Pennsylvania =

The following State Routes run through Allegheny County, Pennsylvania:

== Traffic Routes ==
- PA 8: One of the longest Pennsylvania state routes, this highway's southern terminus is located in Wilkinsburg, at an interchange with Interstate 376. The road then forms that borough's main street as Ardmore Boulevard, before entering Pittsburgh city limits. As the busy Penn Avenue and Washington Boulevard, the highway is a backbone of the northeastern section of the city, serving some of Pittsburgh's richest and poorest neighborhoods. After crossing the Allegheny River via the Senator Robert D. Fleming Bridge, the highway continues as the main drag through a variety of suburban communities. It is four lanes throughout and is frequently lines with businesses all the way to the Butler County line.
- US 19: An essential north-south artery, this highway enters Allegheny County from a busy and quickly growing Washington County suburban corridor. The route is generally only four lane and is often congested from well beyond the county line, as it functions as Washington Road through a variety of prestigious suburbs. After entering the City of Pittsburgh, the route is briefly co-signed with I-376, before branching off of the expressway system to cross the Ohio River via the West End Bridge. Another short freeway stretch appears immediately after crossing the river, as the highway joins with Route 65, before becoming independent once again and winding as the often two-lane Marshall Avenue and Perrysville Avenue through a variety of ethnically diverse Pittsburgh neighborhoods. The route alternates between two and four lanes as it serves dense northern suburbs such as West View, before becoming four lanes for the rest of its time in the county after rejoining with its Truck US 19 branch. The highway eventually meets with the Pennsylvania Turnpike in Marshall Township and serves a heavily commercialized corridor, as it leaves Allegheny for Butler County and an increasingly vast extended suburban area.
- US 19 Truck: This highway marks the original routing of US 19. In the 1940s, two sections of a truck bypass were built to keep heavy vehicles away from the narrow city streets on Pittsburgh's North Side. After the completion of area freeways, the truck designation became irrelevant and the two separate designations were combined. The southern terminus of the route is in the wealthy suburb of Mt. Lebanon. The highway then extends as the narrow and crowded four-lane Liberty Avenue through the dense suburb of Dormont and through Pittsburgh's south-central neighborhoods. The highway then turns to become briefly cosigned with Route 51, before hooking up with Interstates 376 and 279 to cross the Monongahela and Allegheny Rivers via the Fort Pitt Bridge and Fort Duquesne Bridge respectively. At the northern edge of city limits, the highway regains its independence, becoming the wide, four-lane, and business-lined McKnight Road for the rest of its journey. In McCandless, it rejoins its parent and meets its end.
- US 22: This major cross-country highway serves as a freeway for almost its entire path through Allegheny County. It enters the region from Washington County in the west, serving as an expressway connection with Weirton, West Virginia. For its first two miles in the county, it functions independently, before US 30 joins its routing on what is known as the Parkway West. In the busy suburb of Robinson Township, US 22/30 joins on with Interstate 376, and it is cosigned in this manner through the city of Pittsburgh and until that route's eastern terminus. On the office park-lined streets of Monroeville, US 22 branches westward, serving as a four-lane connector as it heads toward suburbanized regions in Westmoreland County.
- US 22 Bus.
- PA 28: At a confusing freeway junction in the East Allegheny neighborhood of Pittsburgh, this highway marks its western terminus. The highway begins as a narrow four-lane East Ohio Street, running in this function through the suburbs of Reserve Township and Millvale. Then, the highway transitions into the Allegheny Valley Expressway and serves as the main freeway connector for Pittsburgh's northeastern suburbs. In Harmar Township, the route intersects with the Pennsylvania Turnpike. As the route leaves Allegheny for Butler County, Pittsburgh's suburban regions transition toward rural hills, and the freeway connection continues to Kittanning.
- US 30: The famous Lincoln Highway enters Allegheny County from a sparsely portion of southern Beaver County. The first mile encompasses one of the few rural patches of Allegheny County, before the two-lane route becomes much more suburban. Soon, the highway becomes cosigned with US 22 in Findlay Township and then with Interstate 376 as it functions as a portion of the Parkway West. Along with its two associated routes, the highway travels onward through Downtown Pittsburgh and into the city's eastern suburbs as the Parkway East. In Forest Hills, the road becomes independent once again and transitions into a busy four-lane, business-lined highway. As it reaches the Westmoreland County line, suburbia continues to line the major highway all the way to Greensburg.
- PA 43: A portion of the long planned Mon-Fayette Expressway, this toll highway remains incomplete in its goal to eventually connect Morgantown, West Virginia with Pittsburgh via the Monongahela Valley. The route enters the county from a small suburban corner of riverfront Washington County, then passes on a variety of viaducts on the rolling topography above the development of Jefferson Hills. The highway currently ends at a toll plaza and junction with Route 51. Future plans call for the route to be extended to I-376 in the eastern neighborhoods of Pittsburgh, although no timetable has been set for this expansion.
- PA 48
- PA 50
- PA 51
- PA 60
- PA 60 Bus. (SR 3160)
- PA 65
- I-76
- I-79
- PA 88
- PA 121
- PA 130
- PA 136
- PA 148
- PA 148 Truck (locally maintained)
- I-279
- PA 286
- PA 366
- I-376
- PA 380 (SR 400)
- I-579
- PA 791
- PA 837
- PA 885
- PA 906
- PA 910
- PA 978
- PA 980

== Quadrant Routes ==
State Route	Name	From	To	Notes
State Route 1001	Butler Street, Bridge Street, Main Street, Freeport Road, Pittsburgh Street, Freeport Road, Seventh Avenue, Tenth Avenue, Freeport Road	PA Route 28 in Etna	Butler County	Former PA Route 28
State Route 1002	Unnamed PA Route 28 Off-ramp	PA Route 28 in O'Hara Township	SR 1001 in O'Hara Township	Connection between new and old PA Route 28 (Freeport Road)
State Route 1003	North Canal Street, Kittanning Pike, Dorseyville Road, Kittanning Street	SR 1001 in Sharpsburg	SR 4109 in Etna	
State Route 1004	Seifried Lane, Kirkwood Drive	SR 1007 in O'Hara Township	SR 1003 in O'Hara Township	
State Route 1005	Highland Park Bridge	PA Route 28 in Sharpsburg	PA Route 8 in Pittsburgh	
State Route 1006	Burchfield Road	PA Route 8 (Butler St., William Flinn Hwy) in Shaler Twp	Middle Road In Indiana Twp	
State Route 1006	Klein Road, Harts Run Road, Dorseyville Road, Fox Chapel Road, Guys Run Road, Locust Hill Road	Bridge over Little Pine Creek, Indiana Twp	PA Route 910 (Indianola Road), Harmar Twp	
State Route 1007	Sharps Hill Road	SR 1004 (Seifried Lane) on O'Hara Township/Shaler line	SR 1003 (Kittanning Pike) on O'Hara/Shaler line	
State Route 1008	Gulf Lab Road, U-PARC	PA Route 910 (Indianola Road) in Harmar Twp	SR 1015 (Russellton Road), Harmar Twp	
State Route 1009	Powers Run Rd	Fox Chapel Rd, Fox Chapel	SR 1001 (Freeport Rd) in O'Hara Township	
State Route 1010	Harts Run Rd	PA Route 8 (Butler St., William Flinn Hwy) in Hampton Twp	SR 1013 (Saxonburg Road), Indiana Twp	
State Route 1011	Guys Run Road	SR 1006 (Locust Hill Rd) in Harmar Twp	SR 1001 (Freeport Rd), Harmar Twp	
State Route 1012	McCully Road, Cedar Run Road, Church Lane	PA Route 8 (Butler St., William Flinn Hwy) in Hampton Twp	SR 1013 (Saxonburg Road), Indiana Twp	
State Route 1013	Saxonburg Boulevard	PA Route 8 (Butler St., William Flinn Hwy) in Shaler Twp	Butler County line	
State Route 1014	Hite Road, Jacoby Road, Tawney Run Road, Murray Hill Road	SR 1015 (Russellton Road), Harmar Twp	SR 1021 (Riddle Run Road), Springdale Twp	
State Route 1015	Pearl Avenue, Little Deer Creek Road, Russellton Road	SR 1001 in Harmar Twp	SR 1028 (Bakerstown Road), West Deer Twp	
State Route 1016				
State Route 1017	Pillow Avenue, Yutes Run Road	SR 1001 in Cheswick	Border of Springdale Twp and Frazer Twp	
State Route 1018
State Route 1019	Butler Street, Butler Road, Henderson Drive, Butler Logan Road, Russellton Airport Road, Creighton Russellton Road, Kurn Road	Intersection at Willow Street in Springdale	Border of West Deer Twp and Frazer Twp	
State Route 1019	Days Run Road	Border of Frazer Twp and East Deer Twp	Baileys Run Road in East Deer Twp	
State Route 1020				
State Route 1021
State Route 1022
State Route 1023
State Route 1024
State Route 1025
State Route 1026
State Route 1027
State Route 1028
State Route 1029
State Route 1030
State Route 1031
State Route 1032
State Route 1033
State Route 1034
State Route 1035
State Route 1036
State Route 1037
State Route 1038
State Route 1039
State Route 1040
State Route 1045

State Route	Name	From	To	Notes
State Route 2001
State Route 2003
State Route 2004
State Route 2005
State Route 2006
State Route 2007
State Route 2008
State Route 2009
State Route 2010
State Route 2011
State Route 2013
State Route 2014
State Route 2015
State Route 2017
State Route 2018
State Route 2020
State Route 2021
State Route 2022
State Route 2023
State Route 2024
State Route 2025
State Route 2026
State Route 2027
State Route 2028
State Route 2030
State Route 2031
State Route 2032
State Route 2033
State Route 2034
State Route 2035
State Route 2036
State Route 2037
State Route 2038
State Route 2039
State Route 2040
State Route 2041
State Route 2042
State Route 2043
State Route 2044
State Route 2045
State Route 2046
State Route 2047
State Route 2048
State Route 2049
State Route 2050
State Route 2051
State Route 2052
State Route 2053
State Route 2054
State Route 2056
State Route 2057
State Route 2058
State Route 2059
State Route 2060
State Route 2061
State Route 2063
State Route 2064
State Route 2065
State Route 2066
State Route 2067
State Route 2068
State Route 2069
State Route 2070
State Route 2071
State Route 2072
State Route 2073
State Route 2074
State Route 2075
State Route 2076
State Route 2078
State Route 2079
State Route 2080
State Route 2081
State Route 2082
State Route 2083
State Route 2084
State Route 2085	Birmingham Bridge	PA Route 837	5th Avenue	
State Route 2086
State Route 2087
State Route 2088
State Route 2090
State Route 2091
State Route 2093
State Route 2094
State Route 2095
State Route 2096
State Route 2097
State Route 2098
State Route 2099
State Route 2101
State Route 2102
State Route 2103	Bigelow Boulevard	bridge over Seventh Avenue (PA Route 380 east)		
State Route 2104
State Route 2105
State Route 2106
State Route 2107
State Route 2108
State Route 2110
State Route 2112
State Route 2114
State Route 2116
State Route 2118
State Route 2120
State Route 2122
State Route 2124
State Route 2126
State Route 2128	Tenth Street Bypass	Interstate 279; U.S. Route 19 Truck	Etna Street	
State Route 2143
State Route 2144	Centre Avenue	bridge over Interstate 579		
State Route 2146	Webster Avenue	bridge over Interstate 579		
State Route 2152
State Route 2183
State Route 2208	Boulevard of the Allies	Interstate 279; U.S. Route 19 Truck	PA Route 885	
State Route 2248
State Route 2308

State Route	Name	From	To	Notes
State Route 3001
State Route 3002
State Route 3003
State Route 3004
State Route 3005
State Route 3006	Boyce Rd., Upper St. Clair Township			
State Route 3007
State Route 3008
State Route 3009
State Route 3010
State Route 3011
State Route 3012
State Route 3013
State Route 3014
State Route 3015
State Route 3016
State Route 3017
State Route 3018
State Route 3020
State Route 3021
State Route 3022
State Route 3023
State Route 3024
State Route 3025
State Route 3026
State Route 3027	Smithfield Street Bridge	PA Route 837	SR 2208	
State Route 3028
State Route 3029
State Route 3031
State Route 3032
State Route 3033
State Route 3034
State Route 3035
State Route 3036
State Route 3037
State Route 3038
State Route 3039
State Route 3041
State Route 3042	Mt. Lebanon Blvd.	Washington Rd. (U.S. 19) in Mt. Lebanon	Castle Shannon Blvd. in Castle Shannon	
State Route 3043
State Route 3044
State Route 3045
State Route 3046
State Route 3048
State Route 3049
State Route 3050
State Route 3051
State Route 3052
State Route 3053
State Route 3054
State Route 3056
State Route 3057
State Route 3058
State Route 3059
State Route 3060
State Route 3061
State Route 3062
State Route 3063
State Route 3064
State Route 3066
State Route 3067
State Route 3069	Washington Road, West Liberty Avenue, Liberty Tunnel, Liberty Bridge	U.S. Route 19	Forbes Avenue	partly signed as U.S. Route 19 Truck
State Route 3070
State Route 3071
State Route 3072
State Route 3073
State Route 3074
State Route 3075
State Route 3077
State Route 3078
State Route 3079
State Route 3080
State Route 3081
State Route 3082
State Route 3083
State Route 3084
State Route 3085
State Route 3087
State Route 3088
State Route 3089
State Route 3090
State Route 3091
State Route 3092
State Route 3093
State Route 3094
State Route 3095
State Route 3096
State Route 3097
State Route 3098
State Route 3099
State Route 3100
State Route 3101
State Route 3102
State Route 3103
State Route 3104
State Route 3105
State Route 3106	West Carson Street	PA Route 51	PA Route 837	tunnels under West End Circle
State Route 3107
State Route 3108
State Route 3109
State Route 3110
State Route 3111
State Route 3117
State Route 3119
State Route 3121
State Route 3123
State Route 3144
State Route 3147
State Route 3160
State Route 3170
State Route 3919
State Route 3921

State Route	Name	From	To	Notes
State Route 4001
State Route 4002
State Route 4003	East Street, Evergreen Road, McKnight Road	Interstate 279 South Exit 4, Venture Street	Perry Highway, U.S. Route 19	Partly signed as U.S. Route 19 Truck
State Route 4004
State Route 4006
State Route 4007
State Route 4008
State Route 4009
State Route 4010
State Route 4011
State Route 4012
State Route 4013
State Route 4014
State Route 4016
State Route 4017
State Route 4018
State Route 4019
State Route 4021
State Route 4022
State Route 4023
State Route 4024
State Route 4025
State Route 4026
State Route 4027
State Route 4028
State Route 4029
State Route 4030
State Route 4031
State Route 4032
State Route 4033
State Route 4034
State Route 4035
State Route 4036
State Route 4037
State Route 4039
State Route 4041
State Route 4042
State Route 4043
State Route 4044
State Route 4045
State Route 4046
State Route 4047
State Route 4048
State Route 4049
State Route 4050
State Route 4051
State Route 4052
State Route 4053
State Route 4054
State Route 4055
State Route 4056
State Route 4057
State Route 4058
State Route 4059
State Route 4060
State Route 4061
State Route 4062
State Route 4063
State Route 4064
State Route 4065
State Route 4067
State Route 4068
State Route 4069
State Route 4070
State Route 4072
State Route 4073
State Route 4076
State Route 4078
State Route 4080
State Route 4084	Western Avenue, Brighton Road, Ridge Avenue, Commons, East Ohio Street	U.S. Route 19; PA Route 65; SR 3919	PA Route 28	former PA Route 28
State Route 4086
State Route 4099
State Route 4133
State Route 4153
State Route 4154
State Route 4165
State Route 4265
