= Girty's Woods =

Permanently protected green space in Allegheny County, Pennsylvania

Coordinates: 40°29′18″N 79°58′45″W

Girty's Woods is a 155-acre (63 ha) permanently protected green space spanning parts of Millvale Borough, Reserve Township, and Shaler Township in Allegheny County, Pennsylvania, United States. The property is owned and managed by the nonprofit Allegheny Land Trust (ALT), which acquired it in 2021 following a grassroots campaign to prevent development of the site.

== Geography and features ==
Girty's Woods extends from residential streets in Reserve Township, past the southern end of Shaler Township, to the urbanized area of Millvale. The property contains steep wooded slopes, open fields, wetland areas, scenic overlooks, and historic ruins. Trails, some formal and others community-forged, crisscross the terrain and offer opportunities for hiking, biking, birdwatching, and on-leash dog walking. Limited bowhunting is permitted during a designated season with an ALT permit.

The woods are largely undeveloped and kept in a natural state, with trails traversing varied terrain including steep hilltops and narrow, rocky paths. Hikers can encounter partial views of downtown Pittsburgh, the neighborhood of Lawrenceville, and a large water tower above Millvale, along with local wildlife such as squirrels and chipmunks. Some trail segments are steep and unmarked, and the terrain can be muddy after rain, leading ALT and local guides to recommend sturdy footwear and navigational awareness.

The forested landscape plays a role in stormwater management by absorbing rainwater that would otherwise contribute to flooding along Girty's Run, a stream that flows through Millvale and into the Allegheny River. According to ALT, the woods absorb approximately 121 million US gallons (460 million litres) of rainwater per year.

== History ==
The site is named for its location within the Girty's Run watershed, itself named after the Girty family, including brothers Simon and Thomas Girty, 18th-century settlers in the region. Before its preservation, the property was privately owned and subject to logging, raising concerns among local residents about the loss of green space and increased flood risk.

In early 2020, a group of community organizers from Millvale approached ALT to pursue conservation of the property. ALT launched the "#SaveGirtysWoods" campaign on April 22, 2020, in partnership with the Millvale Community Development Corporation, Millvale Community Library, New Sun Rising, the Girty's Run Watershed Association, and the Triboro Ecodistrict. The campaign combined grant applications with grassroots fundraising. Despite delays caused by the COVID-19 pandemic, community donations exceeded $88,000, with contributions from more than 650 individuals and local businesses. Major funding came from the Pennsylvania Department of Conservation and Natural Resources, the Allegheny County Redevelopment Authority, the Triboro Ecodistrict, and the Borough of Millvale, with support from elected officials at the state and county levels.

A sustainability class at Shaler Area High School integrated the preservation campaign into its curriculum. Students germinated and grew species such as Kentucky coffeetree, black birch, and burr oak for replanting in the woods, created a fundraising campaign to sell the trees, and promoted the project through media outreach.

The purchase deadline was met in March 2021, ensuring the property's permanent protection. In April 2021, ALT announced that it had finalized the purchase of Girty's Woods. The final campaign raised over $700,000 and involved contributions from local foundations, businesses, and civic groups, as well as cleanup and replanting efforts by volunteers.

== Management and ecology ==
A 2021 management plan prepared by Penn State's Pittsburgh Studio identified long-term ecological restoration and accessibility improvements as priorities for Girty's Woods. The report noted that the woods had experienced extensive soil erosion, invasive plant growth, and habitat fragmentation from historical logging, mining, utility clearings, and All-terrain vehicle use. Recommended interventions included retiring unsustainable trails, creating a stacked-loop trail system with accessible routes from Irwin Lane, and replanting degraded areas with native species such as black birch, chestnut oak, and mountain laurel.

== Recreation ==
Visitors to Girty's Woods can access several miles of trails leading to overlooks, fields, and small wetlands. The property is located within walking distance of nearby neighborhoods and is accessible by public transit and via connections to the Three Rivers Heritage Trail. ALT advises that some community-forged trails may be steep or uneven and recommends caution while hiking. Trailheads are located on Seigel Street in Millvale and Irwin Lane in Reserve Township.
