= Steve Sciullo =

American football player (born 1980)

No. 74, 68
- Position: Guard

Personal information
- Born: August 27, 1980 (age 46); Pittsburgh, Pennsylvania, U.S.
- Listed height: 6 ft 5 in (1.96 m)
- Listed weight: 330 lb (150 kg)

Career information
- High school: Shaler Area (Pittsburgh)
- College: Marshall
- NFL draft: 2003: 4th round, 122nd overall pick

Career history
- Indianapolis Colts (2003); Philadelphia Eagles (2004); Carolina Panthers (2007)*; → Hamburg Sea Devils (2007)
- * Offseason or practice squad member only

Awards and highlights
- Second-team All-American (2002); 2× First-team All-MAC (2001, 2002)

Career NFL statistics
- Games played: 28
- Games started: 18
- Stats at Pro Football Reference

Steven William Sciullo (born August 27, 1980) is an American former professional football player who was a guard in the National Football League (NFL) for the Indianapolis Colts and Philadelphia Eagles. He played college football for the Marshall Thundering Herd.

== Early life ==
Sciullo was born on August 27, 1980, to Karen Ann Sciullo, a hair stylist, and Mario Sciullo a construction superintendent. He is of Italian and Polish descent. He attended Shaler Area High School, graduating in 1998.

== College career ==
He started 52 consecutive games at Marshall University. He is perhaps best known as one of the two Thundering Herd linemen who carried quarterback Byron Leftwich down the field against Akron, after Leftwich had fractured his tibia earlier in the game.

Sciullo was interested in coaching halfway through his final season of college football.

== Professional career ==
Pre-draft measurables
Height	Weight	Arm length	Hand span	40-yard dash	10-yard split	20-yard split	20-yard shuttle	Three-cone drill	Vertical jump	Broad jump	Bench press
6 ft 5 in (1.96 m)	330 lb (150 kg)	32 1/2 in (0.83 m)	9 7/8 in (0.25 m)	5.51 s	1.85 s	3.15 s	4.72 s	7.85 s	28 in (0.71 m)	8 ft 2 in (2.49 m)	23 reps
All values from NFL Combine.

Sciullo was selected 122nd overall by the Indianapolis Colts in the fourth round of the 2003 NFL draft, starting 13 games as a rookie. He was the fourth offensive lineman in Indianapolis Colts history to start a season opener as a rookie. However, Sciullo failed to make the cut at the training camp in 2004.

The Philadelphia Eagles took Sciullo in four days before the 2004 season opener, and he went on to start five times throughout the season on account of Jermane Mayberry's injuries. He even participated in Super Bowl XXXIX, losing to the New England Patriots, which ended up being his final NFL game. He was waived on September 3, 2005.

He signed a reserve/future contract with the Carolina Panthers on January 2, 2007. He was allocated to NFL Europe and played in three games, starting two, for the Hamburg Sea Devils during the 2007 season. He retired on June 28, 2007.

== Post-football career ==
Sciullo began working at Hampton Township School District in 2009, teaching at the middle school and high school buildings when needed. Sciullo works as a security director protecting students and teachers as well as administrators.

He became the head coach of the neighboring Deer Lakes High School varsity football team. “The style I teach is a hybrid of Marshall football, Tony Dungy and Indianapolis Colts football, and Andy Reid and Philadelphia Eagles football,” Sciullo says, regarding his coaching methods. In 2015 Sciullo was named as Pittsburgh Steelers' High School Football Coach of the Week.

On January 26, 2016, Sciullo presented the Shaler Area School District with a commemorative Golden Football through the NFL's Super Bowl High School Honor Roll program during halftime at the boys varsity basketball game.

Most recently, Sciullo resigned from head coaching at Deer Lakes Highschool to take a position on the coaching staff of the Hampton Talbots for the 2018–2019 season, and became the head coach in 2022. Sciullo was recently inducted into Shaler Area High Schools Hall of Fame.
