= Shaler Township, Pennsylvania =

Township in Pennsylvania, US

- Township
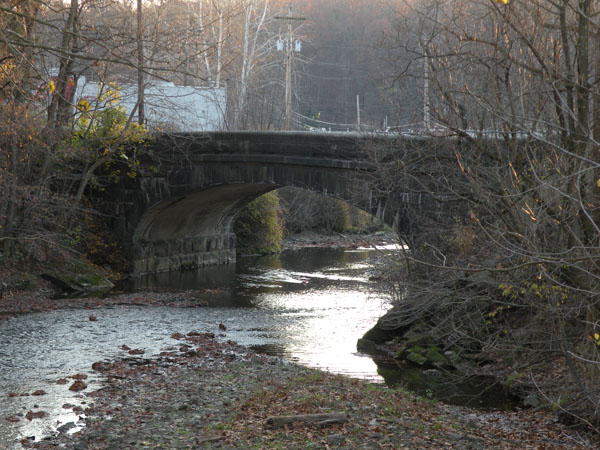
- Bridge in Shaler Township

- Location in Allegheny County and the U.S. state of Pennsylvania.

- Location within Pennsylvania Location within the United States
- Coordinates: 40°31′15″N 79°57′49″W
- Country: United States
- State: Pennsylvania
- County: Allegheny County
- Incorporated: 1847
- Founder: John Shaw, Jr.
- Named for: Charles Shaler

Area
  - Total: 11.16 sq mi (28.91 km^{2})
  - Land: 11.07 sq mi (28.67 km^{2})
  - Water: 0.093 sq mi (0.24 km^{2})

Population (2020)
  - Total: 28,132
  - Density: 2,542/sq mi (981.3/km^{2})
- Time zone: UTC-5 (EST)
  - Summer (DST): UTC-4 (EDT)
- ZIP code: 15101, 15116, 15209, 15215, 15223
- Area code: 412
- FIPS code: 42-003-69584
- School district: Shaler Area
- Website: www.shaler.org

Shaler Township is a township in Allegheny County in the U.S. state of Pennsylvania. It consists of much of the community of Glenshaw and several neighboring communities. The population was 28,132 at the 2020 census. It is part of the Pittsburgh metropolitan area.

== History ==
Traders began settling in the Shaler area in the mid-18th century. The most prominent early trader in the area was George Croghan, who came in the early 1740s. By 1754, settlement included the Pine Creek trading post, where Europeans traded fur and skins with the Mingo and other Native Americans in the Ohio Valley. The second early European settlement was Girty's Run, established by Simon Girty.

The village of Glenshaw, Pennsylvania—at the center of what became Shaler Township—was established in the early 19th century, beginning with a log sawmill built by John Shaw, Sr. after he bought 600 acres (2.4 km^{2}) of land north of Pittsburgh in 1800. The area became known as "Shaw's Glen", and later Glenshaw. Members of the Shaw family subsequently built a log gristmill, a sickle factory, and a coal mine.

On March 20, 1845, a petition to form a new township from portions of Ross and Indiana townships was presented to the Court of Quarter Sessions. Col. James A. Gibson, Alexander V. Brackenridge and John Murray were appointed as viewers. They reported in favor on June 10 of the same year, although it was two years later on March 20, 1847, that the court decree establishing the township was issued, in the name of Marion. While the township was initially confirmed with the name Marion; on the same day the name was changed to Shaler, after Charles Shaler, a prominent mid-19th century Pittsburgh area judge, who served as President Judge of the 5th District Court in Beaver County. The township is not named for the numerous deposits of shale rock found within its borders; this is instead a common misconception.

At the time of establishment, Shaler Township encompassed all of its current holdings plus the boroughs of Etna, Millvale, and a large tract of Ross Township. By 1868, Shaler lost much of its land to the new boroughs. In 1900, Shaler became one of the early townships to be classified as a township of the first class. The township's boundaries remain basically the same today as they were in 1900.

Early settlement of the Shaler area was sporadic, with small farming and mercantile villages appearing. These mainly developed in the valleys next to Pine Creek and Girtys Run. At the time of its incorporation, Shaler Township had a population of 2,000; by 1860 it had grown to 16,399. In the late 19th century, the creation of the Glenshaw Glass plant sped up settlement to a certain degree, drawing workers to settle in the vicinity.

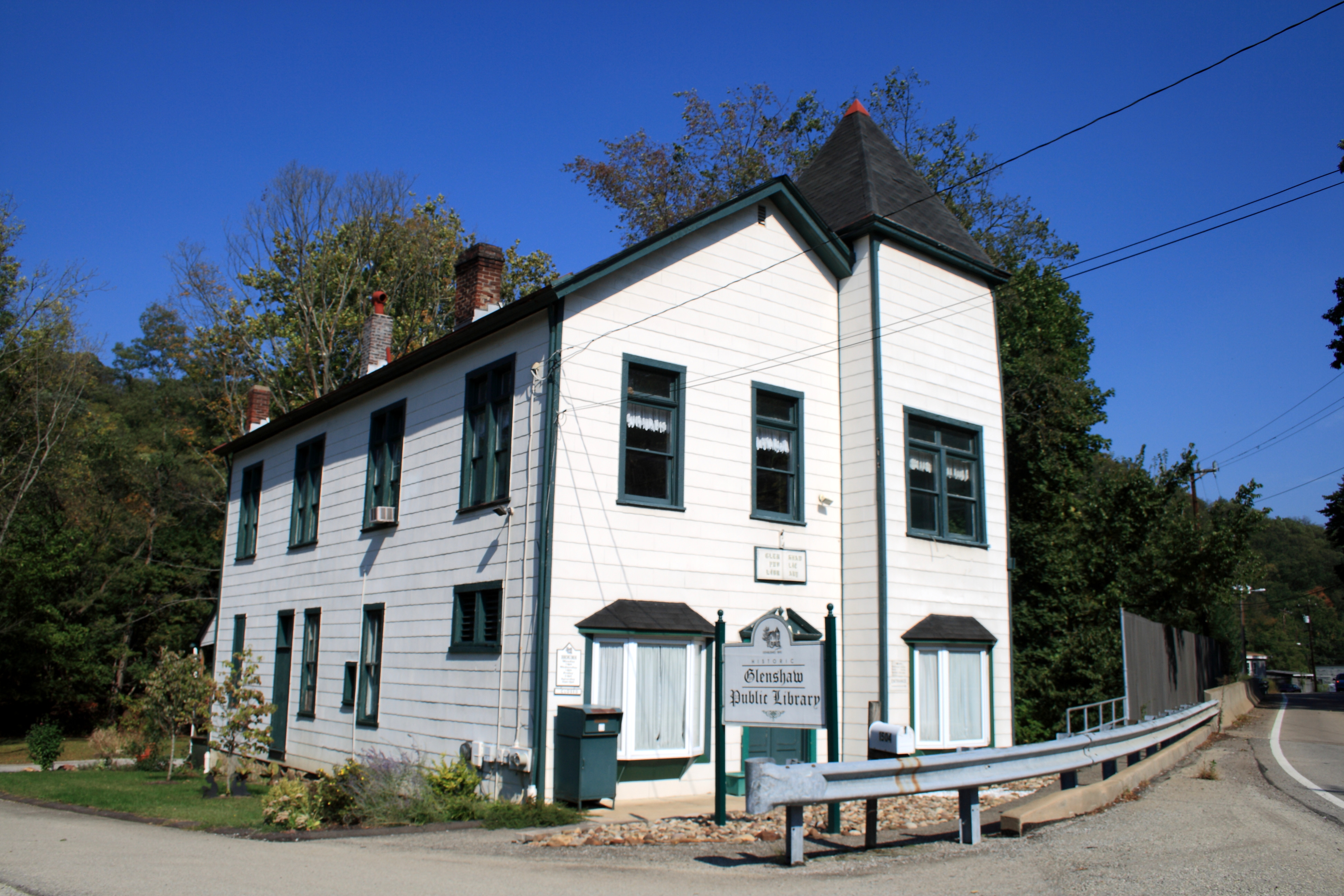
Historic Glenshaw Public Library

From 1907 until 1931 the interurban Pittsburgh and Butler Street Railway passed through the township, linking it with Pittsburgh and Butler.

Following the Second World War Shaler became an affluent suburb with many former City of Pittsburgh residents now populating the Township. Shaler, along with Ross Township, was among the first outer-city areas to develop into the modern suburbs which today define the North Hills region of Allegheny County. Home building and development during this time period was extensive. Shaler remained and still remains a primarily residential municipality, and it was during this period which the Township came to acquire the attributes it still holds today.

== Geography ==
Shaler Township is located at 40°31′15″N 79°57′49″W (40.520926, -79.963784). According to the U.S. Census Bureau, the township has a total area of 11.2 square miles (29.0 km^{2}), of which 11.0 square miles (28.5 km^{2}) is land and 0.2 square mile (0.5 km^{2}) (1.70%) is water. It contains part of the census-designated place of Allison Park.

A portion of the permanently protected Girty's Woods falls within the boundaries of the township.

=== Streams ===
Shaler is largely hilly, with three stream valleys which run from the north into the Allegheny River: the valleys of Pine Creek and Little Pine Creek converge in the borough of Etna, while the valley of Girtys Run goes from Shaler into the borough of Millvale.

=== Surrounding and adjacent communities ===
Shaler Township has eight land borders, including Hampton Township to the north, Indiana Township to the northeast, O'Hara Township to the east, Sharpsburg, Etna (mostly surrounded by Shaler Township) to the southeast, Millvale to the south-southwest, Reserve Township to the southwest, and Ross Township to the west. Shaler also runs catty-corner (without a direct border) with McCandless Township to the northwest. Across the Allegheny River to the south, Shaler runs adjacent with the Pittsburgh neighborhoods of Central and Upper Lawrenceville.

Several portions of the township have Pittsburgh mailing addresses.

== Demographics ==
Historical population
Census	Pop.	Note	%±
1940	11,185		—
1950	16,430		46.9%
1960	24,939		51.8%
1970	33,369		33.8%
1980	33,694		1.0%
1990	30,533		−9.4%
2000	29,757		−2.5%
2010	28,757		−3.4%
2020	28,132		−2.2%
U.S. Decennial Census

As of the census of 2000, there were 29,757 people, 11,932 households, and 8,686 families residing in the township. The racial makeup of the township was 97.9% White, 0.4% African American, 0.1% Native American, 0.9% Asian, 0.02% Pacific Islander, 0.1% from other races, and 0.6% from two or more races. Hispanic or Latino of any race was 0.5% of the population.

There were 11,932 households, out of which 28.6% had children under the age of 18 living with them, 62.1% were married couples living together, 8.2% had a female householder with no husband present, and 27.2% were non-families. 24.4% of all households were made up of individuals, and 12.1% had someone living alone who was 65 years of age or older. The average household size was 2.48 and the average family size was 2.97.

In the township the population was spread out, with 22.0% under the age of 18, 5.6% from 18 to 24, 28.1% from 25 to 44, 25.8% from 45 to 64, and 18.5% who were 65 years of age or older. The median age was 42 years. For every 100 females, there were 91.2 males. For every 100 females age 18 and over, there were 88.5 males.

The median income for a household in the township was $49,118, and the median income for a family was $56,998. Males had a median income of $40,991 versus $29,473 for females. The per capita income for the township was $23,223. About 3.0% of families and 4.6% of the population were below the poverty line, including 4.5% of those under age 18 and 7.0% of those age 65 or over.

== Government and politics ==
United States presidential election results for Shaler Township, Pennsylvania
Year	Republican		Democratic		Third party(ies)	
Year	No.	%	No.	%	No.	%
2024	9,105	48.64%	9,361	50.01%	252	1.35%
2020	9,257	49.45%	9,239	49.35%	225	1.20%
2016	8,539	52.89%	7,443	46.10%	162	1.00%
2012	8,746	54.30%	7,231	44.89%	131	0.81%
2008	9,151	54.10%	7,544	44.60%	219	1.29%

=== Board of Commissioners ===
2026-2028

- Frank Iozzo (D), Ward 1
- Josh Fleitman (D), Ward 2
- David Shutter (R), Ward 3
- Conrad Wagner (D), Vice President, Ward 4
- Susan Fisher (R), Ward 5
- James Boyle (D), President, Ward 6
- William Cross (R), Ward 7

== Notable people ==
- Glenn Beckert, Major League Baseball Second baseman with the Chicago Cubs (1965–73) and San Diego Padres (1974–75).
- Tom Corbett, Governor of Pennsylvania, 2011–2015; former Shaler Township Commissioner
- Art Howe, Major League Baseball infielder with the Pittsburgh Pirates, Houston Astros, and St. Louis Cardinals; manager with the Houston Astros, Oakland Athletics, and New York Mets.
- Mark Madden, Radio personality, sports journalist, and former World Championship Wrestling commentator.
- Connor Michalek
- Jim Shearer, TV Personality, VH1 Top 20 Video Countdown host, Creator of Yinz Luv Da Guins and Yinz Luv da Stillers video blog on YouTube
- Ian Terry, winner of Big Brother 14

== Education ==
- Shaler Area School District
- Shaler Area High School
