= Millvale, Pennsylvania =

Borough in Allegheny County, Pennsylvania, US

Millvale
- Borough
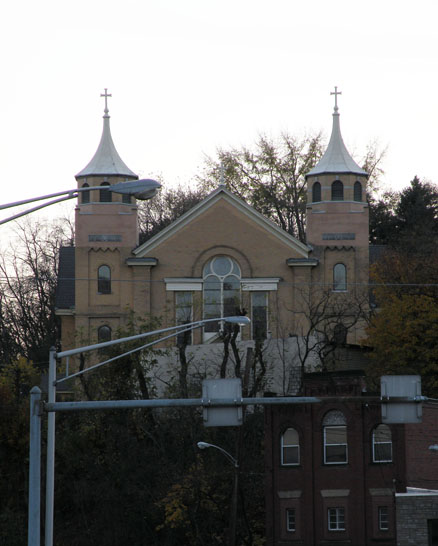
- St. Nicholas Croatian Church in Millvale

- Location in Allegheny County and the state of Pennsylvania.

- Location of Pennsylvania in the United States
- Coordinates: 40°28′58.69″N 79°58′25.41″W
- Country: United States
- State: Pennsylvania
- County: Allegheny
- Founded: February 13, 1868

Government
  - Body: Millvale Borough Council
  - Mayor: Brian Spoales

Area
  - Total: 0.68 sq mi (1.75 km^{2})
  - Land: 0.62 sq mi (1.60 km^{2})
  - Water: 0.058 sq mi (0.15 km^{2})

Population (2020)
  - Total: 3,376
  - Density: 5,456.0/sq mi (2,106.58/km^{2})
- Time zone: UTC-5 (EST)
  - Summer (DST): UTC-4 (EDT)
- ZIP code: 15209
- Area code: 412
- FIPS code: 42-49920
- Website: www.millvalepa.com

Millvale is a borough in Allegheny County, Pennsylvania, United States, along the Allegheny River, opposite Pittsburgh. The borough is located off Pennsylvania Route 28. The population was 3,376 at the 2020 census.

Current estimates place the 2024 population at around 3,247 residents.

== Geography ==
Millvale is located at 40°28′59″N 79°58′25″W (40.482968, −79.973725).

According to the U.S. Census Bureau, the borough has a total area of 0.7 square miles (1.8 km^{2}), of which 0.6 square miles (1.6 km^{2}) is land and 0.1 square miles (0.26 km^{2}), or 9.72%, is water.

Millvale is located at the confluence of Girty's Run and the Allegheny River. Much of the borough is on a floodplain and has been subjected to extensive flooding at many times during its history. In particular, the borough's business district frequently sustains substantial damage.

== History ==
Prior to the European colonization, the Millvale area was the starting point of the Venango Path, a Native American trail which led to Lake Erie. The Seneca people hunted and fished the lands. The European Simon Girty and his father settled in the area. During a major raid by Chief Tewea of the Lenape and Captain François Coulon de Villiers of the French, Girty's stepfather was taken captive, tortured, and killed. Chief Guyasuta adopted Simon and assimilated him into Seneca culture. Due to his difficulty living with Europeans, Simon settled on the Venango Path near a creek which now bears his name.

=== 18th century ===
After fighting against the British Army in the American Revolution, Girty moved to Canada. The creek on which he settled is now called Girty's Run Creek.

Following the victory of the Continental Army in the American Revolutionary War, many Continental Army soldiers were awarded land. John Sample was awarded the Millvale area. Allegheny City later purchased 164 acres of the Sample estate to place a poor farm on the site, which ran for twenty-three years. The poor farm brought industry into Millvale, including an 1847 forge that became the rolling mill owned by Henry Phipps. Andrew Carnegie and Phipps later founded Carnegie Steel.

=== 19th century ===
In 1849, Herrs Island and the adjacent riverfront land of Reserve Township spanning from its northeastern boundary near Girty's Run downriver to Butcher's Run were incorporated as the Borough of Duquesne, distinct from the modern city of the same name.

In 1857, the Pennsylvania Railroad purchased the right of way from the Pennsylvania Canal System. A massive influx of immigrants searching for work at the nearby railroad occurred at what is now the 40th Street Bridge resulting in the construction of a passenger rail station.

In 1868, Duquesne was partitioned with the downriver portion annexed by Allegheny City, and the land upriver of the northern end of Herrs Island joined with adjacent lands to the north and east taken from Shaler Township to form Millvale.

On February 13, 1868, Millvale Borough was incorporated from parts of Shaler Township and Duquesne Borough with an initial population of 668. It was named after its industry, milling, and location, a valley. The borough expanded after the American Civil War and was connected to Lawrenceville via the Ewalt Covered Bridge and a narrow gauge railroad that would become part of Pittsburgh’s trolley system. At the turn of the century, Millvale annexed the Third Ward from the Shaler Township.

=== 20th century ===
At the start of the Great Depression, Millvale was a target of the Works Progress Administration which attempted to reign in Girty’s Run Creek. The borough was also an important industrial center for America's effort in World War II.

Following the conclusion of World War II, Millvale experienced an economic boom and, until 1952, the borough was served by the "3 Millvale" trolley operated by Pittsburgh Railways. America’s energy crisis and the downfall of the steel industries later led to a steady decline in population which continues through the present day.

== Surrounding communities ==
Millvale has three land borders with Shaler Township from the northwest to east, the Pittsburgh neighborhood of Troy Hill to the southwest, and Reserve Township to the west. Across the Allegheny River, Millvale runs adjacent with Lower Lawrenceville and Central Lawrenceville. Millvale regularly collaborates with its northern riverside neighbors of Etna and Sharpsburg.

== Demographics ==
Historical population
Census	Pop.	Note	%±
1870	668		—
1880	1,824		173.1%
1890	3,809		108.8%
1900	6,736		76.8%
1910	7,861		16.7%
1920	8,031		2.2%
1930	8,166		1.7%
1940	7,811		−4.3%
1950	7,287		−6.7%
1960	6,624		−9.1%
1970	5,815		−12.2%
1980	4,772		−17.9%
1990	4,341		−9.0%
2000	4,028		−7.2%
2010	3,744		−7.1%
2020	3,376		−9.8%

=== 2020 census ===
As of the 2020 census, Millvale had a population of 3,376 and a population density of 5,453.96 inhabitants per square mile (2,105.79/km^{2}).

The median age was 37.8 years. About 15.1% of residents were under age 18, 69.9% were from ages 18 to 64, and 15.0% were age 65 or older. For every 100 females there were 103.4 males, and for every 100 females age 18 and over there were 102.5 males age 18 and over. 100.0% of residents lived in urban areas and 0.0% lived in rural areas.

There were 2,038 housing units, of which 13.7% were vacant. The homeowner vacancy rate was 2.7% and the rental vacancy rate was 6.3%. There were 1,759 households, of which 18.2% had children under age 18. Of all households, 21.4% were married-couple households, 31.8% had a male householder with no spouse or partner present, and 35.9% had a female householder with no spouse or partner present. About 48.1% were one-person households, and 15.5% had a person aged 65 or older living alone. The average household size was 2.05 and the average family size was 2.93.

Racial composition as of the 2020 census
Race	Number	Percent
White	2,978	88.2%
Black or African American	122	3.6%
American Indian and Alaska Native	7	0.2%
Asian	19	0.6%
Native Hawaiian and Other Pacific Islander	0	0.0%
Some other race	43	1.3%
Two or more races	207	6.1%
Hispanic or Latino (of any race)	115	3.4%

=== Income and poverty ===
The median income for a household in the borough was $48,512, and the median income for a family was $66,938. Males had a median income of $39,846 versus $33,024 for females. About 10.13% of the population were below the poverty line, including 9.6% of males and 10.71% of females. 9.05% of white residents were below the poverty line compared to 23.25% of black residents and 41.67% of Hispanic residents living below the poverty line. The total unemployment rate was 4.3%.

=== Veterans ===
Millvale was also home to 134 veterans, 114 of which were male and 20 of which were female. Of those veterans, 47 served in the Vietnam War, 15 served in the Second Gulf War, and 7 served in the Korean War. Millvale had a 23.13% veteran poverty rate and a 19.4% veteran disability rate.

=== Demographic estimates ===
39.08% of Millvale residents had a high school diploma as their highest academic attainment, 11.35% had an associate degree, 14.12% had a bachelor's degree, and 7.38% had a graduate degree of any kind.

83.07% of residents were born in Millvale, 99.62% were born as American citizens, and 0.38% were naturalized immigrants. There were no reported non-naturalized residents. Of the naturalized immigrants, 100% were Asian in origin.

== Culture ==
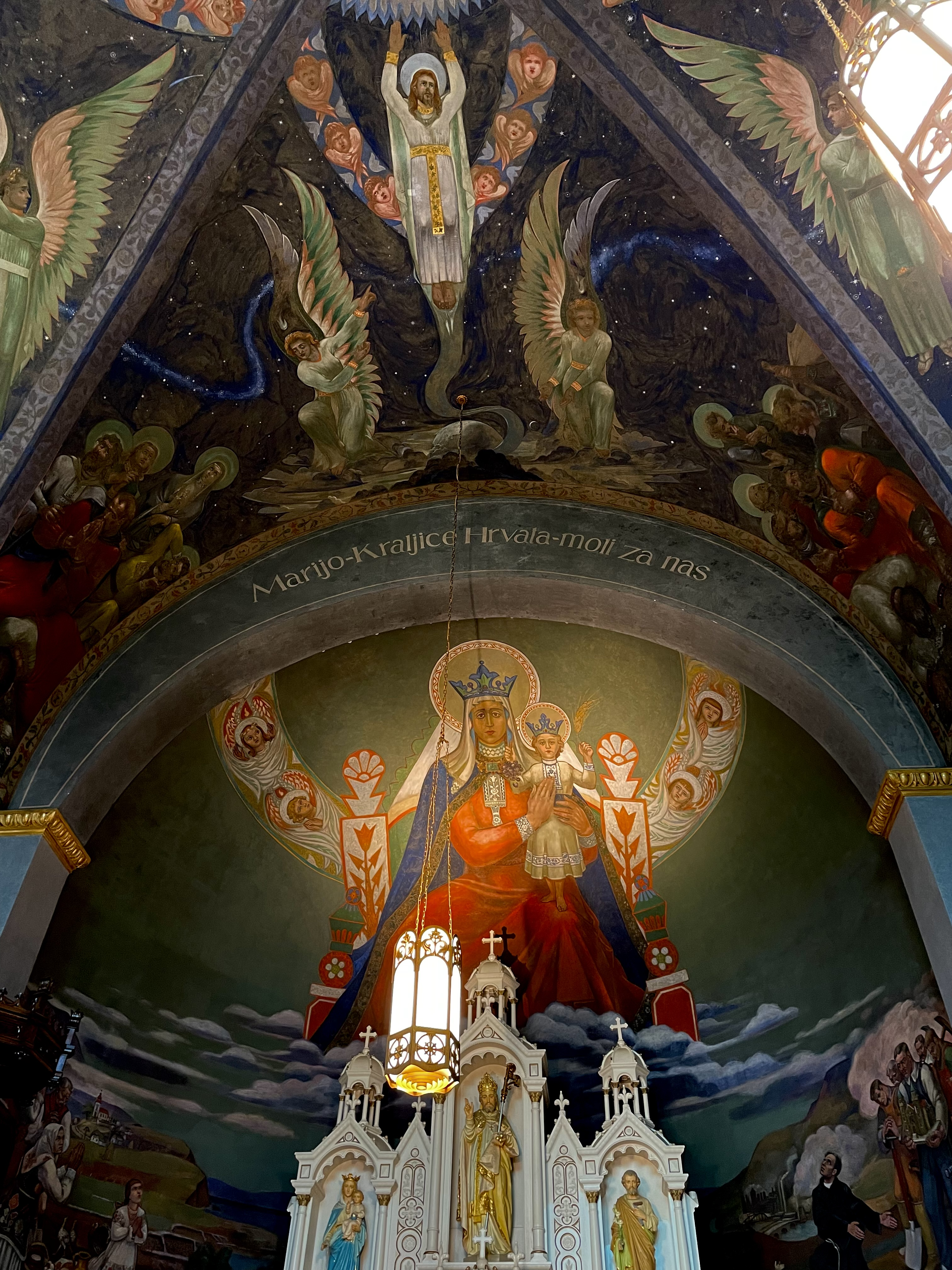
The altar ceiling at St. Nicholas Croatian Catholic Church in Millvale painted by Maksimilijan Vanka

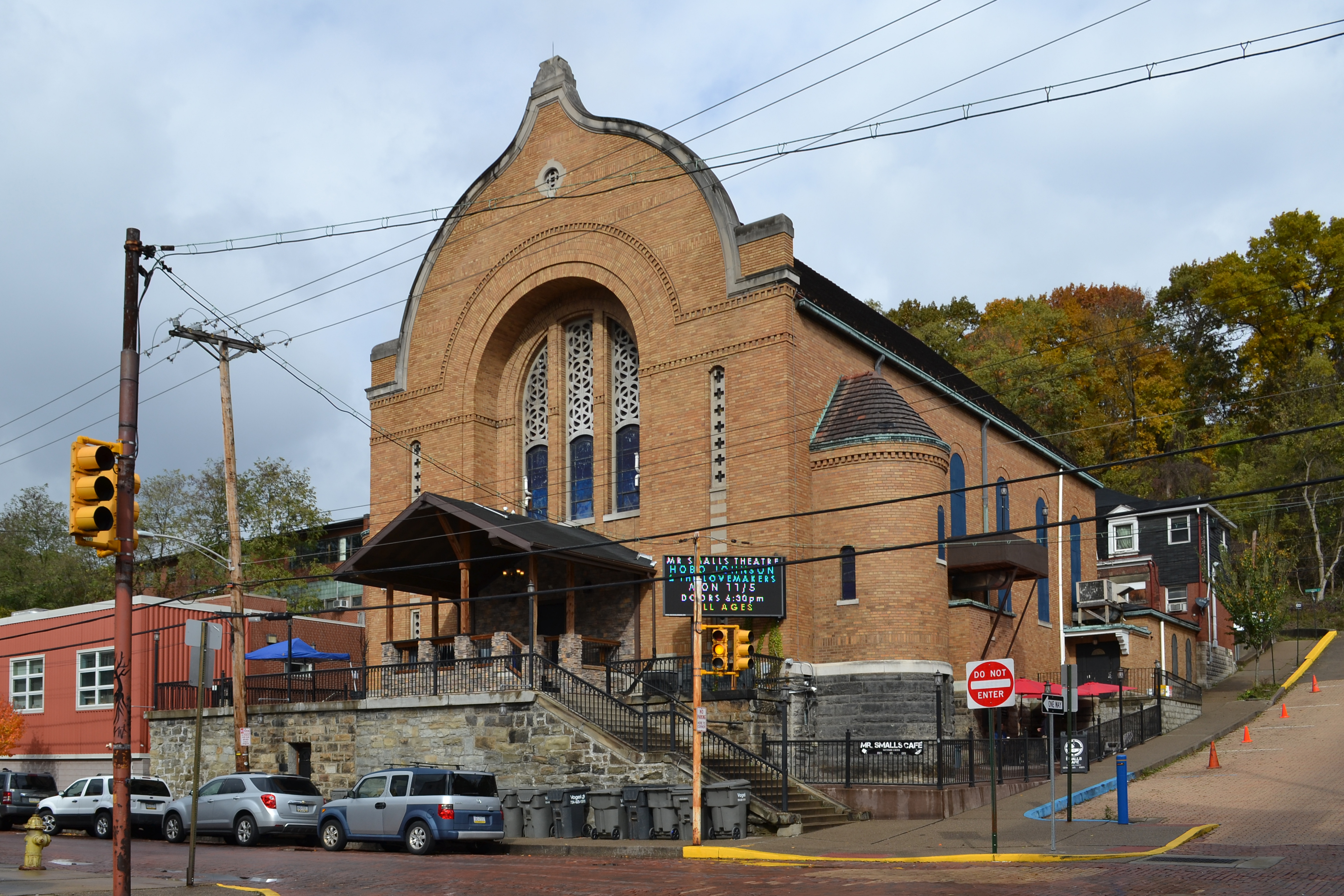
Mr. Smalls Theatre, formerly St. Ann Church, A nationally renowned concert and event venue

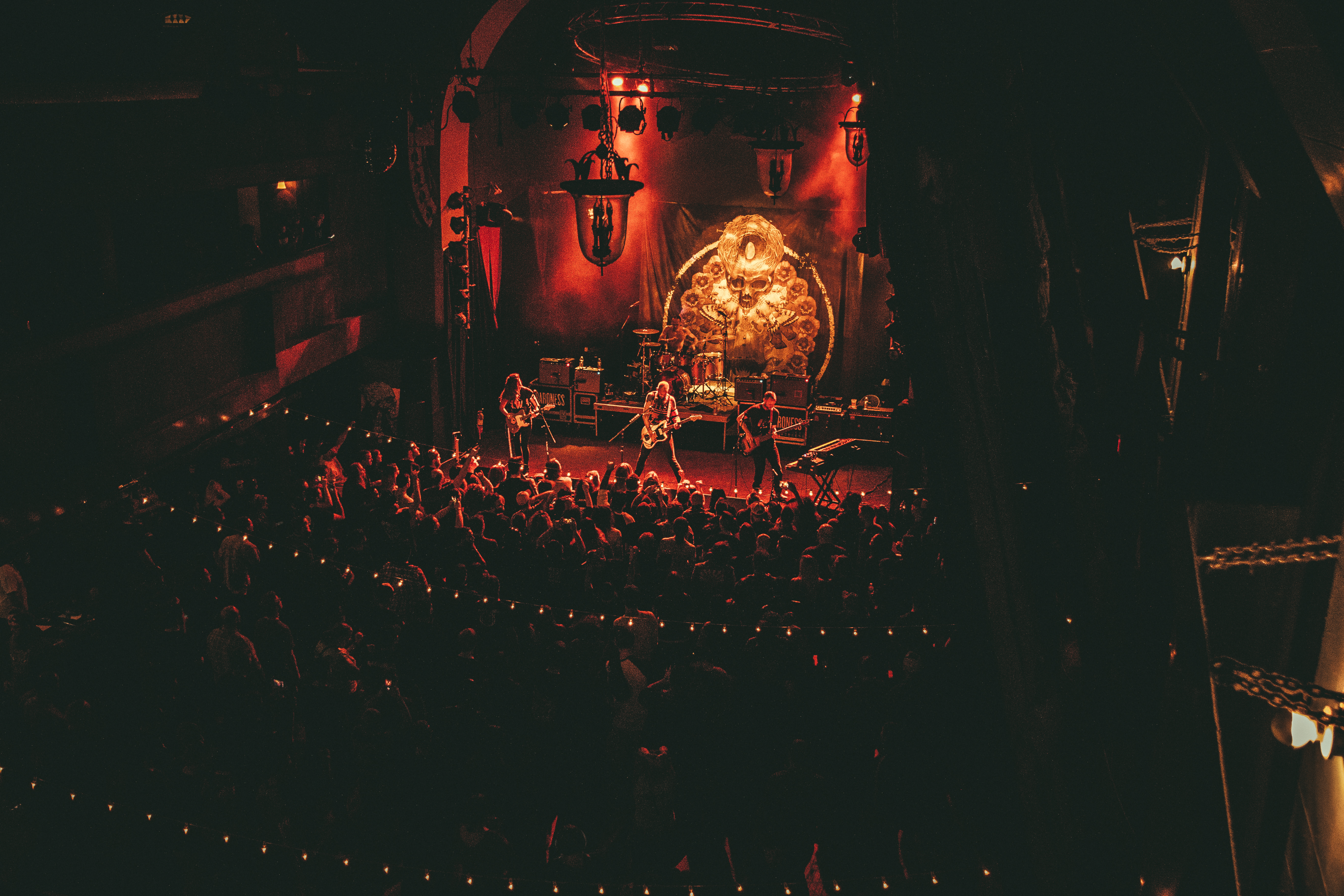
Baroness playing inside Mr. Smalls

St. Nicholas Roman Catholic Church, built in 1901, was the first Croatian parish in the United States. Painted on the walls of the church are the murals of Croatian artist Maksimilijan Vanka. Painted in the 1930s and 1940s, the murals were Vanka's gift to the United States.

In the 21st century, Millvale is home to a thriving bar and music scene. One of Pittsburgh's most popular live music venues, Mr. Smalls Theatre, hosts international musical acts of various genres and is a center for cultural activities for residents of both Millvale and nearby Pittsburgh. There are also a number of craft breweries and locally owned bars in the area including numerous themed and boutique breweries and bars.

The borough is host to numerous cultural and artistic festivals including the Millvale Music Festival, Millvale Pride Festival, and the Millvale Days Festival.

The borough is also host to numerous well known restaurants and food service businesses.

== Government and politics ==
=== Government ===
Since its incorporation in 1868, the government of Millvale is primarily regulated by the Millvale Borough Council. The council, which has seven members, acts as the legislative body in the borough. Members can be elected to a four year term or appointed to a two year term.

The borough also elects a mayor who has authority over policing, veto powers, and tiebreaking powers. Additionally, the borough council appoints a chief administrative officer tasked with carrying out and enforcing council ordnances.

Government offices are primarily located in the Borough Building, which is located on the corner of Lincoln Avenue and Sedgwick Street.

The borough is represented in the U.S. Congress by US House District PA-17, in the PA State Senate by Pennsylvania Senate District 42, and in the PA State House by Pennsylvania House District 21.

=== Politics ===
Presidential election results
Year	Republican	Democratic	Third parties
2020	38% 673	59% 1,026	1% 28
2016	40% 618	55% 853	6% 86
2012	39% 517	60% 795	1% 22
2008	42% 620	55% 819	3% 43

=== Crime and law enforcement ===
Millvale is primarily served by the Millvale Borough Police Department. The department is headed by the borough mayor and police chief and consists of four full-time officers and six part-time officers. The borough is also under the jurisdiction of numerous county, state, and even City of Pittsburgh departments including the Allegheny Port Authority Transit Police, Allegheny County Police Department, and Pittsburgh Bureau of Police.

==== Crime statistics per 100,000 residents ====
Pittsburgh statistic as of 2012, US & Millvale as of 2022.

	Murder	Rape	Robbery	Assault	Burglary	Theft	Motor vehicle	Total violent	Total property
Pittsburgh	13.1	15.1	363.3	360.4	812.8	2,438.2	174.3	752.0	3,425.4
National	6.1	40.7	135.5	282.7	500.1	2,310.9	284	457.0	2,826.9
Millvale	0.0	0.0	0.0	110.0	137.6	2,042.8	27.5	110.0	2207.9

== Education ==
The Borough of Millvale is served by Shaler Area School District. The district boasts four K-3 primary education buildings, one 4-6 elementary school, one 7-8 middle school, and one 9-12 high school and has 4,162 students as of 2019. The district has a student-teacher ratio of 12-1. It has a graduation rate of 95% (national: 87%), an average SAT score of 1180 (national: 1050), and an average ACT score of 26 (national: 19.8).

The district spends an average of $23,023 per student (national: $12,239) and pays its teachers an average of $87,092.

The school district's athletic department contracts Athletic Trainers and medical services through UPMC sports medicine and provides accessible care and comprehensive injury prevention & recognition teaching.

As of December 2023, the school district is ranked #152 out of 496 total public school districts in Pennsylvania. It is ranked #80 in teacher quality and #135 in quality for athletes. In Allegheny County, it is ranked #21 of 41 districts.

== Recreation ==
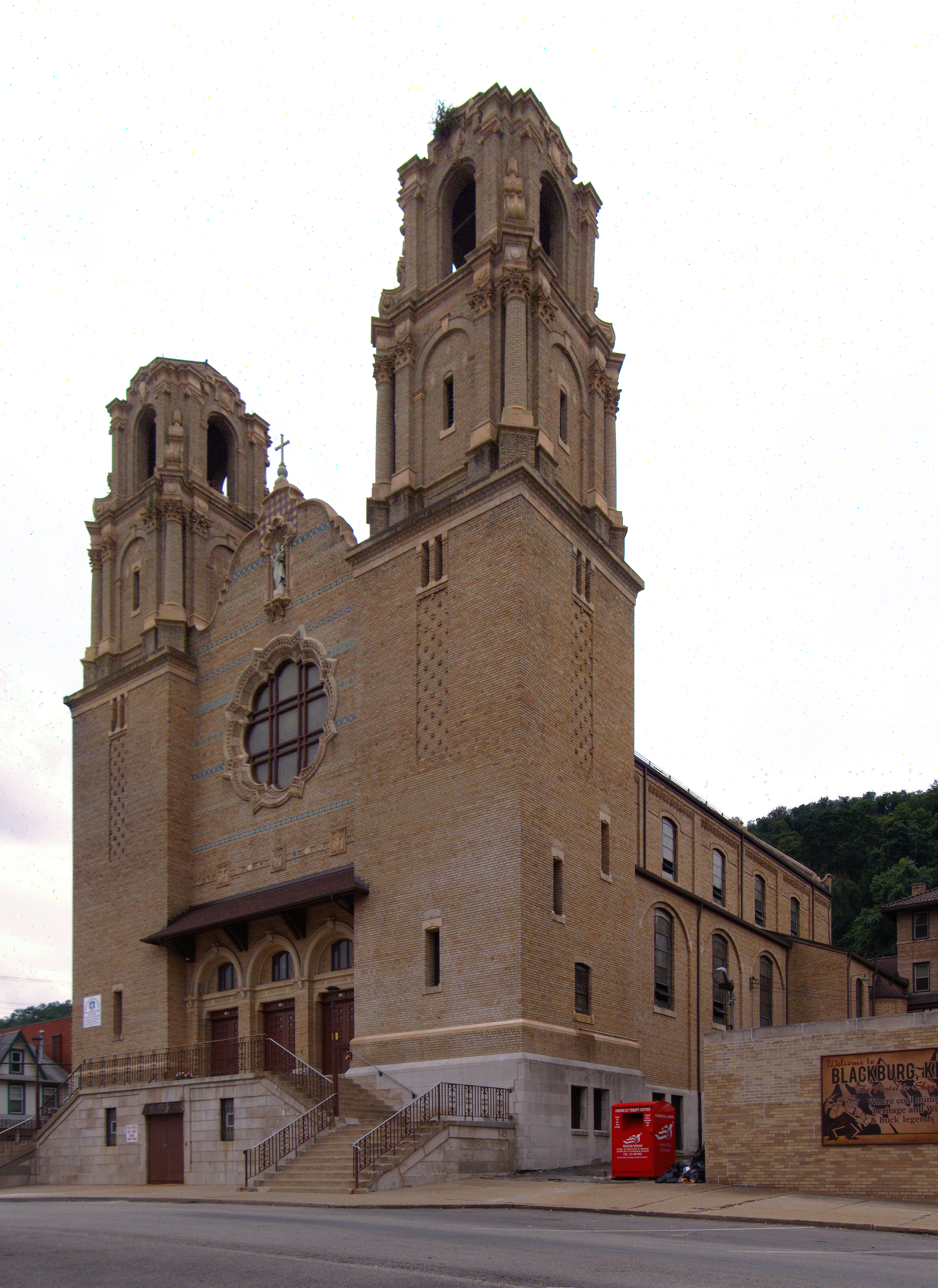
Holy Spirit Parish in Millvale

Millvale Riverfront Park provides a 1.7 mile bike and walking trail that provides access from Millvale to Pittsburgh's North Shore, PNC Park, and Acrisure Stadium along the Three Rivers Heritage Trail. The trail meanders along the Allegheny River, past Herrs Island, the TRRA Millvale Boathouse, and into the Millvale Riverfront Park. Plans to connect the Millvale Trail to points north are being discussed. Access to the Millvale business district is less than half a mile away and restrooms are available. Other park amenities include a beautiful pavilion with riverfront access and a full kitchen, Millvale Marina, kayak and rowing boat launch access, fishing, and more.

The Millvale Community Library has been launched as an all-volunteer effort of community members to take several vacant buildings and lots and turn them into a multi-use space centered on creating Millvale's first public library and associated garden space. This project was launched by community volunteers and Pittsburgh-based non-profit organization, New Sun Rising, in 2007 and enlisted hundreds of volunteers to help turn this community dream into a reality.

In the 2010s the Millvale Ecodistrict was launched and centered community development and programs around the ecological principals of equity, food, water, energy, air quality and mobility. This work has led to over a decade of investments in solar, energy efficiency, street trees and bioswales, community gardens, bike lanes and bike racks, improved wheelchair access on sidewalks, food pantries and a free community fridge all with a focus on taking care of neighbors and the environment of Millvale.

Girty's Woods lies immediately outside the boundaries of the borough and was acquired by the Allegheny Land Trust in 2021 in partnership with Millvale-based organizations and residents including the Millvale Community Development Corporation.

Preceded by Etna	Bordering communities of Pittsburgh	Succeeded by Reserve Township
