= Bridge in Shaler Township =

- U.S. National Register of Historic Places
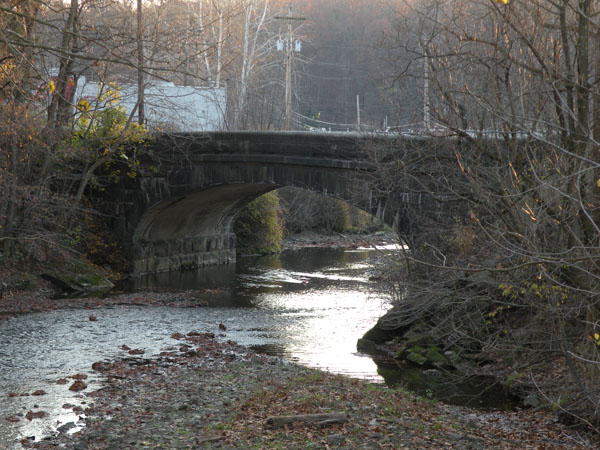

- Location within Pennsylvania Location within the United States
- Location: Birchfield Road over Pine Creek, Shaler Township, Pennsylvania, USA
- Coordinates: 40°32′42.03″N 79°57′45.49″W
- Built: 1915
- Architectural style: single span stone arch bridge
- MPS: Highway Bridges Owned by the Commonwealth of Pennsylvania, Department of Transportation TR
- NRHP reference No.: 88000797
- Added to NRHP: June 22, 1988

The Bridge in Shaler Township, which carries Burchfield Road over Pine Creek, is a single span stone arch bridge in Allegheny County, Pennsylvania built in 1915. The bridge is a high quality ashlar construction with the single span covering 63 feet. Stone arch bridges are rare in western Pennsylvania.

The bridge was added to the National Register of Historic Places on June 22, 1988.
