= Allison Park, Pennsylvania =

Census-designated place in Pennsylvania, United States

- Census-designated place
- Bus stop in Allison Park

- Location in Allegheny County and the U.S. state of Pennsylvania
- Country: United States
- State: Pennsylvania
- County: Allegheny

Area
  - Total: 13.86 sq mi (35.90 km^{2})

Population (2020)
  - Total: 21,864
  - Density: 10,583.9/sq mi (4,086.48/km^{2})
- Time zone: UTC-5 (Eastern (EST))
  - Summer (DST): UTC-4 (EDT)
- ZIP code: 15101
- Area code: 412
- FIPS code: 42-02056

Allison Park is a census-designated place in Allegheny County, Pennsylvania, United States. It is a suburb of Pittsburgh and is located within Hampton, McCandless, Shaler, Indiana and West Deer townships. It had a population of 21,864 at the 2020 census. The ZIP Code for Allison Park is 15101.

== History ==
In the 18th century, Allison Park was called Talley Cavey and was part of the large Pitt Township. Talley Cavey is Irish Gaelic for "hill over the borough". Early Irish settlers named it after Tullycavy on the Ards Peninsula outside Greyabbey, County Down, now in Northern Ireland. The town started in the woods that are now along Mt. Royal Boulevard, and continued until it reached what is now the Pennsylvania Turnpike.

== Demographics ==
=== 2020 census ===
As of the 2020 census, Allison Park had a population of 21,864. The median age was 44.7 years. 19.5% of residents were under the age of 18 and 22.3% of residents were 65 years of age or older. For every 100 females there were 93.8 males, and for every 100 females age 18 and over there were 91.5 males age 18 and over.

98.2% of residents lived in urban areas, while 1.8% lived in rural areas.

There were 8,838 households in Allison Park, of which 26.6% had children under the age of 18 living in them. Of all households, 57.1% were married-couple households, 15.2% were households with a male householder and no spouse or partner present, and 23.6% were households with a female householder and no spouse or partner present. About 27.9% of all households were made up of individuals and 15.8% had someone living alone who was 65 years of age or older.

There were 9,285 housing units, of which 4.8% were vacant. The homeowner vacancy rate was 1.4% and the rental vacancy rate was 7.6%.

Racial composition as of the 2020 census
Race	Number	Percent
White	19,737	90.3%
Black or African American	363	1.7%
American Indian and Alaska Native	10	0.0%
Asian	810	3.7%
Native Hawaiian and Other Pacific Islander	2	0.0%
Some other race	118	0.5%
Two or more races	824	3.8%
Hispanic or Latino (of any race)	414	1.9%

== Education ==
Allison Park is divided among the Hampton Township School District, North Allegheny School District, Shaler Area School District, and Deer Lakes School District with students attending the schools for the respective municipality they reside in.
