= Jim Miller (halfback) =

American football player (1908–1965)

No. 20
- Position: Halfback

Personal information
- Born: February 19, 1908; Sharpsburg, Pennsylvania, U.S.
- Died: February 10, 1965 (aged 56); Pittsburgh, Pennsylvania, U.S.
- Listed height: 5 ft 11 in (1.80 m)
- Listed weight: 195 lb (88 kg)

Career information
- High school: Sharpsburg (Pennsylvania)
- College: West Virginia Wesleyan

Career history
- Brooklyn Dodgers (1930)
- Stats at Pro Football Reference

Henry F. "Jim" Miller (February 19, 1908 – February 10, 1965) was an American professional football halfback who played one season with the Brooklyn Dodgers of the National Football League (NFL). He played college football at West Virginia Wesleyan College.

== Early life and college ==
Henry F. Miller was born on February 19, 1908, in Sharpsburg, Pennsylvania. He attended Sharpsburg High School in Sharpsburg.

Miller played college football for the West Virginia Wesleyan Bobcats of West Virginia Wesleyan College.

== Professional career ==
Miller signed with the Brooklyn Dodgers of the National Football League in 1930. He played in four games for the Dodgers during the 1930 season, and scored one receiving touchdown. He wore jersey number 20 while with the Dodgers. Miller stood 5'11" and weighed 195 pounds.

== Personal life ==
Miller died on February 10, 1965, in Pittsburgh, Pennsylvania.
