= Hampton High School (Allison Park, Pennsylvania) =

Public school in Allison Park, Pennsylvania, United States

Location
- 2929 McCully Road; Allison Park, Pennsylvania 15101; United States; 40°35′01″N 79°56′25″W

Information
- Type: Public
- Motto: A Tradition of Excellence
- Established: 1943
- School district: Hampton Township School District
- Principal: Marguerite Imbarlina
- Grades: 9th–12th
- Color
- Athletics conference: WPIAL AAA
- Mascot: Talbot
- Website: hhs.ht-sd.org

Hampton High School is located in Hampton Township, a northern suburb of Pittsburgh, Pennsylvania, USA. It is managed by the Hampton Township School District.

== School statistics ==
Statewide high school ranking (from national website, based solely on PSSA test scores)

- 2016 - 63rd of 674
- 2015 - 9th of 674
- 2014 - 8th of 674
- 2013 - 6th of 674
- 2012 - 12th of 674
- 2011 - 9th of 674
- 2010 - 21st of 674

== Sports ==
Hampton competes in District 7 (WPIAL) and in the PIAA.

Hampton offers 24 interscholastic programs: football, rollerball, boys' soccer, girls' soccer, boys' cross country, girls' cross country, golf, boys' tennis, girls' tennis, volleyball, boys' basketball, girls' basketball, boys' swimming and diving, girls' swimming and diving, girls' competitive spirit (cheerleading), girls' gymnastics, wrestling, baseball, softball, boys' track and field and girls' track and field, boys' lacrosse and girls' lacrosse. In addition there are five club sports: crew, ice hockey, in-line hockey, ultimate frisbee and disc golf.

=== PIAA state championships ===
- 2023: boys cross country (AA)
- 2010: boys soccer (AA)
- 1999: boys swimming (AA)
- 1998: boys swimming (AA)
- 1997: boys swimming (AA)
- 1996: boys swimming (AA)
- 1990: boys soccer (AA)

== Notable alumni ==
- Former NFL football player Red Mack (Super Bowl I Champion)
- Comedian Steve Byrne
- Tom Fec of the indie rock band Black Moth Super Rainbow
- Rap duo Grand Buffet
- Musician and songwriter Kevin Garrett (musician) (co-writer and producer on Beyoncé's album Lemonade)

== In popular culture ==
Hampton High School was used on location for the 2011 thriller Abduction.

== Sources ==
- Hampton Township School District website
- School website
- Greatschools.net
- wpial website
- laxpower
- PHUL website
