= Shaler Area School District =

School district in Pennsylvania, United States

Location
- 1800 Mount Royal Blvd; Glenshaw, PA 15116-2117 (North of Pittsburgh) Allegheny County, Pennsylvania United States

District information
- Type: Public

Students and staff
- District mascot: Titan
- Colors: Navy Blue, White and Red

Other information
- Website: Shaler Area School District

Shaler Area School District is a large, urban and suburban public school district located in Allegheny County, Pennsylvania. Shaler Area School District encompasses approximately 14 square miles (36 km^{2}) in Pittsburgh's northern suburbs, including Shaler Township, Etna Borough, Millvale Borough, and Reserve Township.

According to 2000 federal census data, it served a resident population of 41,565. By 2010, the district's population declined to 39,293 people. In 2009, Shaler Area School District residents’ per capita income was $21,333, while the median family income was $52,135. In the Commonwealth, the median family income was $49,501 and the United States median family income was $49,445, in 2010. By 2013, the median household income in the United States rose to $52,100.

== Schools ==
There are Seven schools in the Shaler Area School District. The schools in order from lowest grade levels to highest are:

- Burchfield Primary (K - 3rd Grade)
- Jeffery Primary (K - 3rd Grade) Closed in 2018
- Marzolf Primary (K - 3rd Grade)
- Reserve Primary (K - 3rd Grade)
- Scott (Formerly Rogers) Primary (K - 3rd Grade)
- Shaler Area Elementary School(4th - 6th Grade)
- Shaler Area Middle School (7th and 8th Grade)
- Shaler Area High School (9th - 12th Grade)

== Extracurriculars ==
The Shaler Area School District offers a variety of clubs, activities and an extensive sports program. The district has both a marching band and an orchestra.

=== Sports ===
The District funds:

Boys

- Baseball - AAAA
- Basketball V/JV- AAAA
- Bowling - AAAA
- Cross Country - AAA
- Football - AAAA
- Golf - AAAA
- Indoor Track and Field - AAAA
- Ice Hockey
- Lacrosse - AAAA
- Soccer - AAA
- Swimming and Diving - AAA
- Tennis - AAA
- Track and Field - AAA
- Volleyball - AAA
- Wrestling - AAA

Girls

- Basketball - AAAA
- Bowling - AAAA
- Cheer - AAAA
- Cross Country - AAA
- Golf - AAA
- Indoor Track and Field AAA
- Lacrosse - AAAA
- Soccer (Fall) - AAA
- Softball - AAAA
- Swimming and Diving - AAA
- Girls' Tennis - AAA
- Track and Field - AAA
- Volleyball - AAA

According to PIAA directory July 2013.

Shaler's teams are all nicknamed "The Titans." Shaler athletics compete in the WPIAL/PIAA AAAA/AAA divisions depending on sport.

Shaler's biggest rivals are the neighboring North Allegheny Tigers and North Hills Indians, both of which compete in the same section.

Shaler's softball team took home numerous PIAA and WPIAL titles from 2000 to 2009.

== Neighboring Districts ==
Shaler Area School District neighbors are: North Hills S.D. to the west, Hampton Township S.D. to the north, Fox Chapel Area S.D. to the east, and the Pittsburgh S.D. to the south.
