= Pine Creek (Allegheny River tributary) =

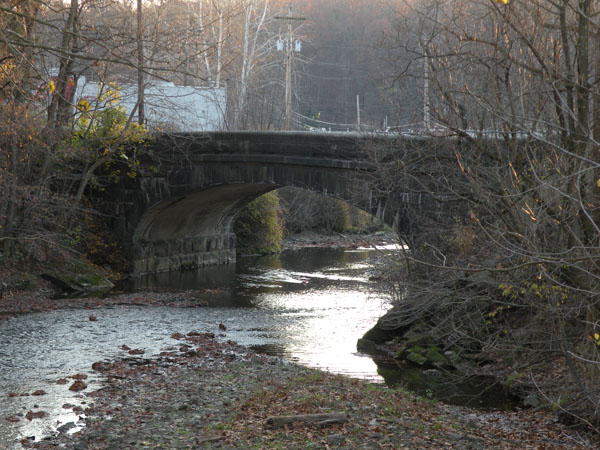
- Bridge in Shaler Township that carries Burchfield Road over Pine Creek

Location
- Country: United States

Physical characteristics
- Source
  - coordinates: 40.6392337°N 80.0725582°W
- Mouth
  - coordinates: 40.4892355°N 79.9511633°W
  - elevation: 712 ft (217 m)

Basin features
- River system: Allegheny River

Pine Creek is a tributary of the Allegheny River located in Allegheny County, Pennsylvania, United States.

== Course ==
Pine Creek joins the Allegheny River at the borough of Etna.

=== Tributaries ===
(Mouth at the Allegheny River)

- Little Pine Creek (west bank)
- Little Pine Creek (east bank)
- Willow Run
- Montour Run
- North Fork Pine Creek
- Wexford Run

== See also ==
- List of rivers of Pennsylvania
- List of tributaries of the Allegheny River
