= Etna, Pennsylvania =

Borough in Pennsylvania, US

- Borough
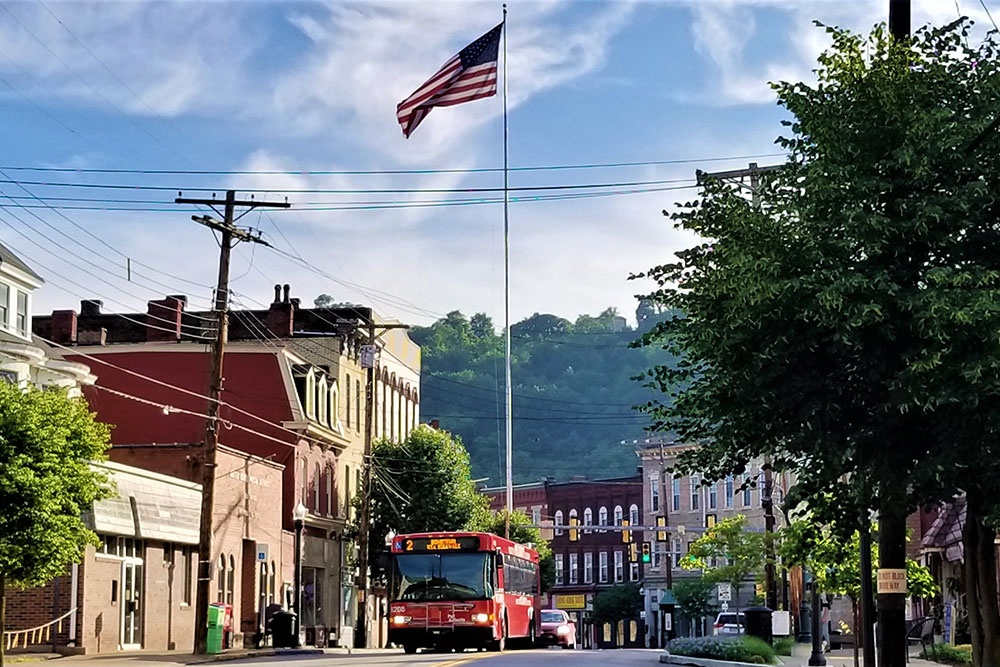
- Butler Street in Downtown Etna
- Motto: "Etna is for Everyone"
- Interactive map of Etna, Pennsylvania
- Location within Pennsylvania Location within the United States
- Coordinates: 40°30′1″N 79°56′56″W (40.500338, −79.948755).
- Country: United States
- State: Pennsylvania
- County: Allegheny
- Incorporated: September 16, 1868
- Named for: Mount Etna

Government
  - Type: Borough
  - Body: Council
  - Mayor: Robert Tuñón

Area
  - Total: 0.80 sq mi (2.07 km^{2})
  - Land: 0.74 sq mi (1.91 km^{2})
  - Water: 0.066 sq mi (0.17 km^{2})

Population (2020)
  - Total: 3,437
  - Density: 4,669.9/sq mi (1,803.06/km^{2})
- Time zone: UTC-5 (EST)
  - Summer (DST): UTC-4 (EDT)
- ZIP code: 15223
- FIPS code: 42-24160
- Website: www.etnaborough.org

Etna is a borough in Allegheny County, Pennsylvania, United States. It is located at the mouth of Pine Creek on the Allegheny River, directly across from Pittsburgh. As of the 2020 census, Etna had a population of 3,437.

== History ==
Incorporated in 1868, Etna was named after the Sicilian volcano Mount Etna, an allusion to the blast furnaces, steel mills, galvanized-pipe works, and other manufacturers located there. Historically a blue-color mill town, Etna was home to the Isabella Furnace of Carnegie Steel, built in 1872 and operated until 1953. A second major manufacturing mill, the Etna Iron Works, was established in 1894 and later became Spang Chalfant & Co. in 1910.

Following historic flooding caused by Hurricane Ivan in 2004, Etna began a comprehensive reinvention focused on community resilience and through its emergency preparedness efforts, participation in the Community Rating System, implementation of green streetscapes, development of Etna Riverfront Park, and the establishment of the Etna Center for Community.

The community has been recognized for its innovative work in green infrastructure and sustainable redevelopment. In 2019, Etna became the world's first certified ecodistrict.

== Geography ==
Etna is located off Pennsylvania Route 28 from Pittsburgh and borders the Allegheny River and Pine Creek. According to the United States Census Bureau, the borough has a total area of 0.8 square miles (2.1 km^{2}), all land. Etna is almost entirely bordered by Shaler Township, with its only other border being with the borough of Sharpsburg to the southeast. Nearby to the west is Millvale, and Pittsburgh is immediately across the Allegheny River to the south.

== Demographics ==
Historical population
Census	Pop.	Note	%±
1870	1,447		—
1880	2,334		61.3%
1890	3,707		58.8%
1900	5,384		45.2%
1910	5,830		8.3%
1920	6,341		8.8%
1930	7,493		18.2%
1940	7,223		−3.6%
1950	6,750		−6.5%
1960	5,519		−18.2%
1970	5,819		5.4%
1980	4,534		−22.1%
1990	4,200		−7.4%
2000	3,924		−6.6%
2010	3,451		−12.1%
2020	3,437		−0.4%

=== 2020 census ===
As of the 2020 census, Etna had a population of 3,437. The median age was 38.1 years. 18.1% of residents were under the age of 18 and 13.4% of residents were 65 years of age or older. For every 100 females there were 98.6 males, and for every 100 females age 18 and over there were 97.8 males age 18 and over.

100.0% of residents lived in urban areas, while 0.0% lived in rural areas.

There were 1,629 households in Etna, of which 21.2% had children under the age of 18 living in them. Of all households, 29.9% were married-couple households, 27.0% were households with a male householder and no spouse or partner present, and 33.4% were households with a female householder and no spouse or partner present. About 40.4% of all households were made up of individuals and 12.1% had someone living alone who was 65 years of age or older.

There were 1,806 housing units, of which 9.8% were vacant. The homeowner vacancy rate was 0.7% and the rental vacancy rate was 8.8%.

Racial composition as of the 2020 census
Race	Number	Percent
White	3,019	87.8%
Black or African American	144	4.2%
American Indian and Alaska Native	4	0.1%
Asian	36	1.0%
Native Hawaiian and Other Pacific Islander	3	0.1%
Some other race	42	1.2%
Two or more races	189	5.5%
Hispanic or Latino (of any race)	115	3.3%

=== 2000 census ===
As of the 2000 census, there were 3,924 people, 1,749 households, and 981 families residing in the borough. The population density was 5,254.8 inhabitants per square mile (2,028.9/km^{2}). There were 1,934 housing units at an average density of 2,589.9 per square mile (1,000.0/km^{2}). The racial makeup of the borough was 97.78% White, 0.76% African American, 0.36% Native American, 0.15% Asian, 0.15% from other races, and 0.79% from two or more races. Hispanic or Latino of any race were 1.15% of the population.

There were 1,749 households, out of which 26.6% had children under the age of 18 living with them, 38.2% were married couples living together, 13.7% had a female householder with no husband present, and 43.9% were non-families. 38.5% of all households were made up of individuals, and 15.8% had someone living alone who was 65 years of age or older. The average household size was 2.22 and the average family size was 3.01.

In the borough the population was spread out, with 22.6% under the age of 18, 8.0% from 18 to 24, 31.7% from 25 to 44, 20.6% from 45 to 64, and 17.1% who were 65 years of age or older. The median age was 39 years. For every 100 females there were 89.1 males. For every 100 females age 18 and over, there were 84.6 males.

The median income for a household in the borough was $31,529, and the median income for a family was $41,577. Males had a median income of $31,386 versus $23,601 for females. The per capita income for the borough was $17,580. About 7.5% of families and 9.2% of the population were below the poverty line, including 12.0% of those under age 18 and 17.5% of those age 65 or over.

== Parks and recreation ==
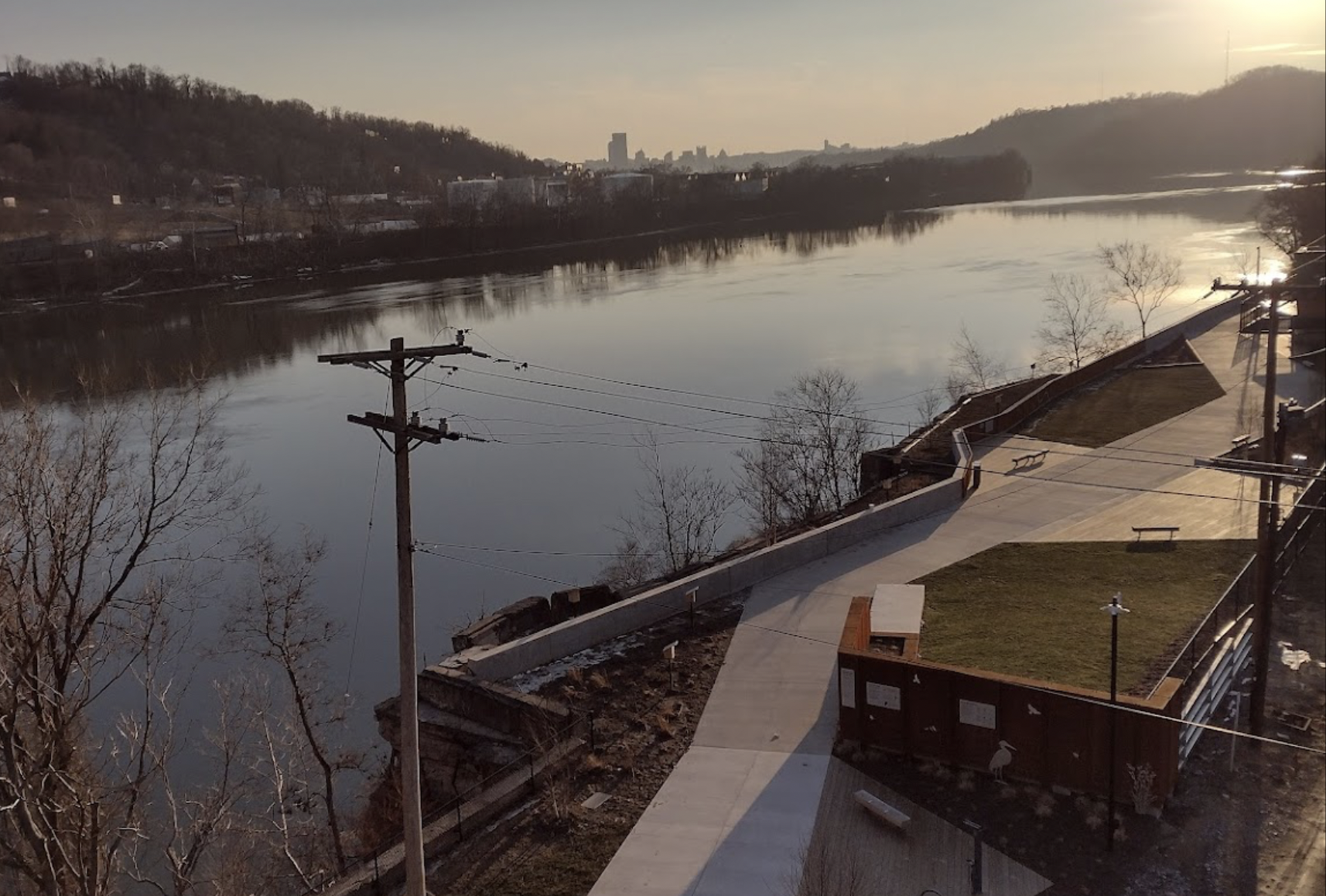
Etna River Front Park

The Etna Riverfront Trail opened October 22, 2021. The Etna segment of the Riverfront trail project will connect via bike path to a series of Riverfront Parks including Millvale, North Shore, Sharpsburg and Aspinwall.

Etna Riverfront is a recreational area that borders the Allegheny River, with paved walking paths, lookout spots, benches and picnic tables.

Dougherty Nature Trail is a walking trail behind Dougherty Veteran's Field that runs along Pine Creek. Dougherty Nature Trail is accessible from Crescent Street by Dougherty Veteran's Field and a pedestrian bridge to Pine Street past the Etna Park.

The Etna Center for Community (ECC) is set to open in fall of 2026. The facility is owned by the Etna Community Organization (ECO), a non-profit organization that serves the Etna community. The ECC is housed in a mixed-use building, with the community center-library space on the ground floor and private apartments on the upper floors. The ECC will serve as a public amenity, providing indoor space for residents to gather, a library collection of over 6,000 books, access to computers and internet, and educational programs.

== Education ==
Etna is part of the Shaler Area School District, which encompasses multiple of Pittsburgh's northern suburbs.

Preceded by Sharpsburg	Bordering communities of Pittsburgh	Succeeded by Millvale
