= Sharpsburg, Pennsylvania =

Borough in Pennsylvania, United States

- Borough
- Borough of Sharpsburg
- Location in Allegheny County and the U.S. state of Pennsylvania.
- Coordinates: 40°29′43″N 79°55′44″W
- Country: United States
- State: Pennsylvania
- County: Allegheny
- Established: 1826
- Chartered: 1842

Government
  - Type: Borough
  - Mayor: Kayla Portis

Area
  - Total: 0.63 sq mi (1.63 km^{2})
  - Land: 0.48 sq mi (1.24 km^{2})
  - Water: 0.15 sq mi (0.39 km^{2})

Population (2020)
  - Total: 3,187
  - Estimate (2019): 3,318
  - Density: 6,933.3/sq mi (2,676.96/km^{2})
- Time zone: UTC−5 (Eastern (EST))
  - Summer (DST): UTC−4 (EDT)
- ZIP Code: 15215
- Area codes: 412, 878
- FIPS code: 42-69776
- Website: sharpsburgborough.com

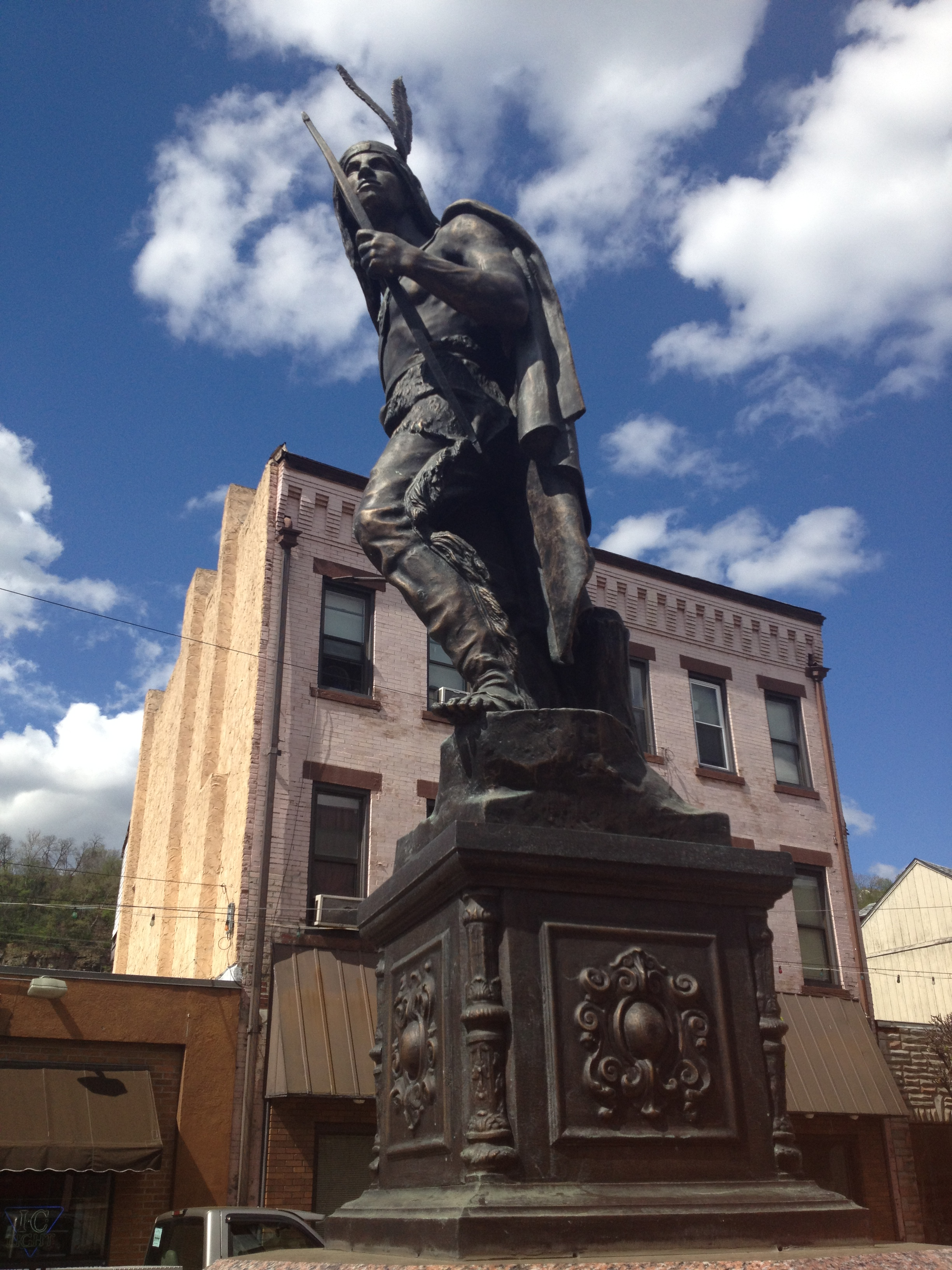
The third incarnation of the Native American Statue located in the heart of the Sharpsburg Central Business District, commonly referenced as Chief Guyasuta.

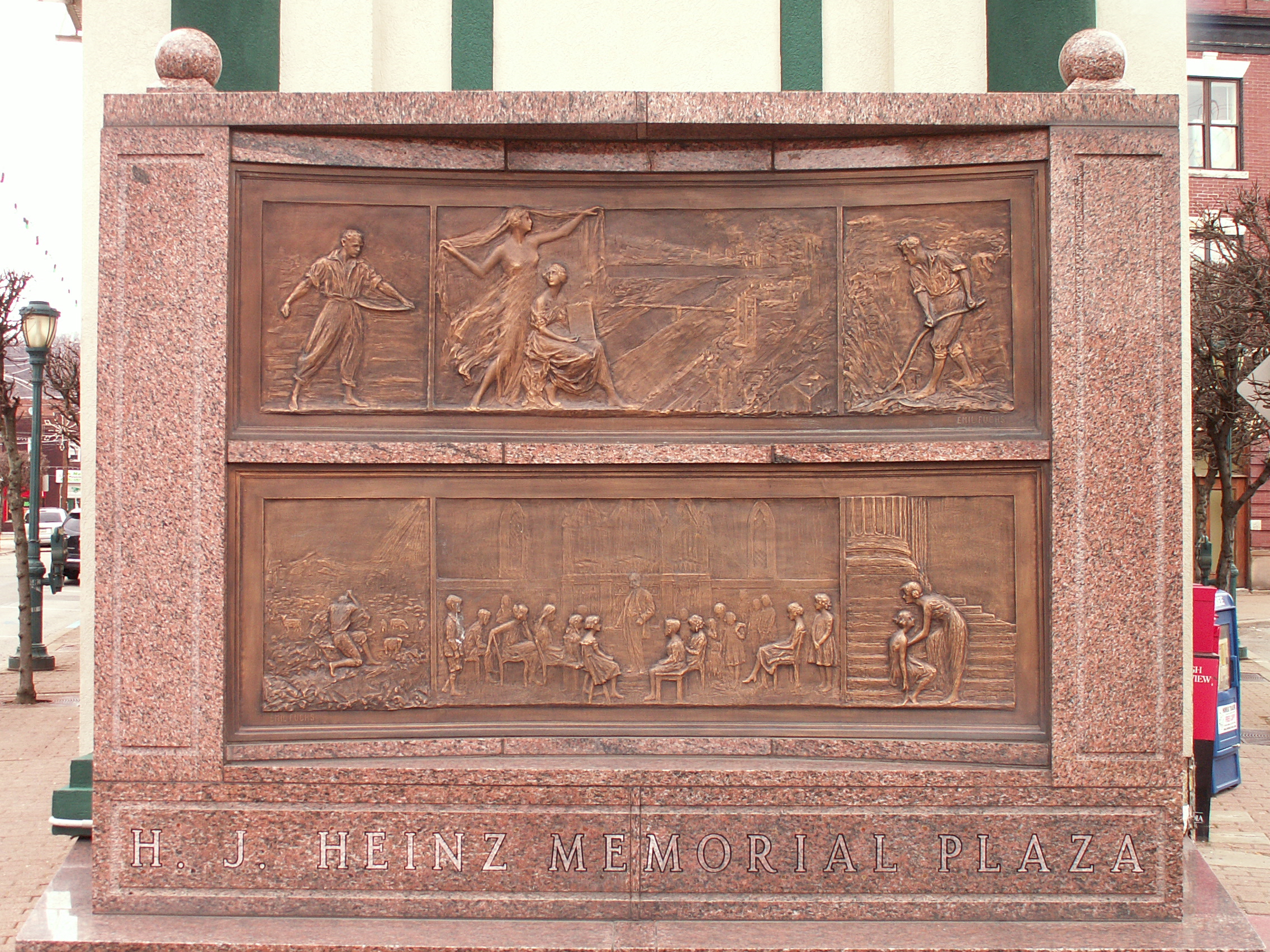
H. J. Heinz Memorial Plaza

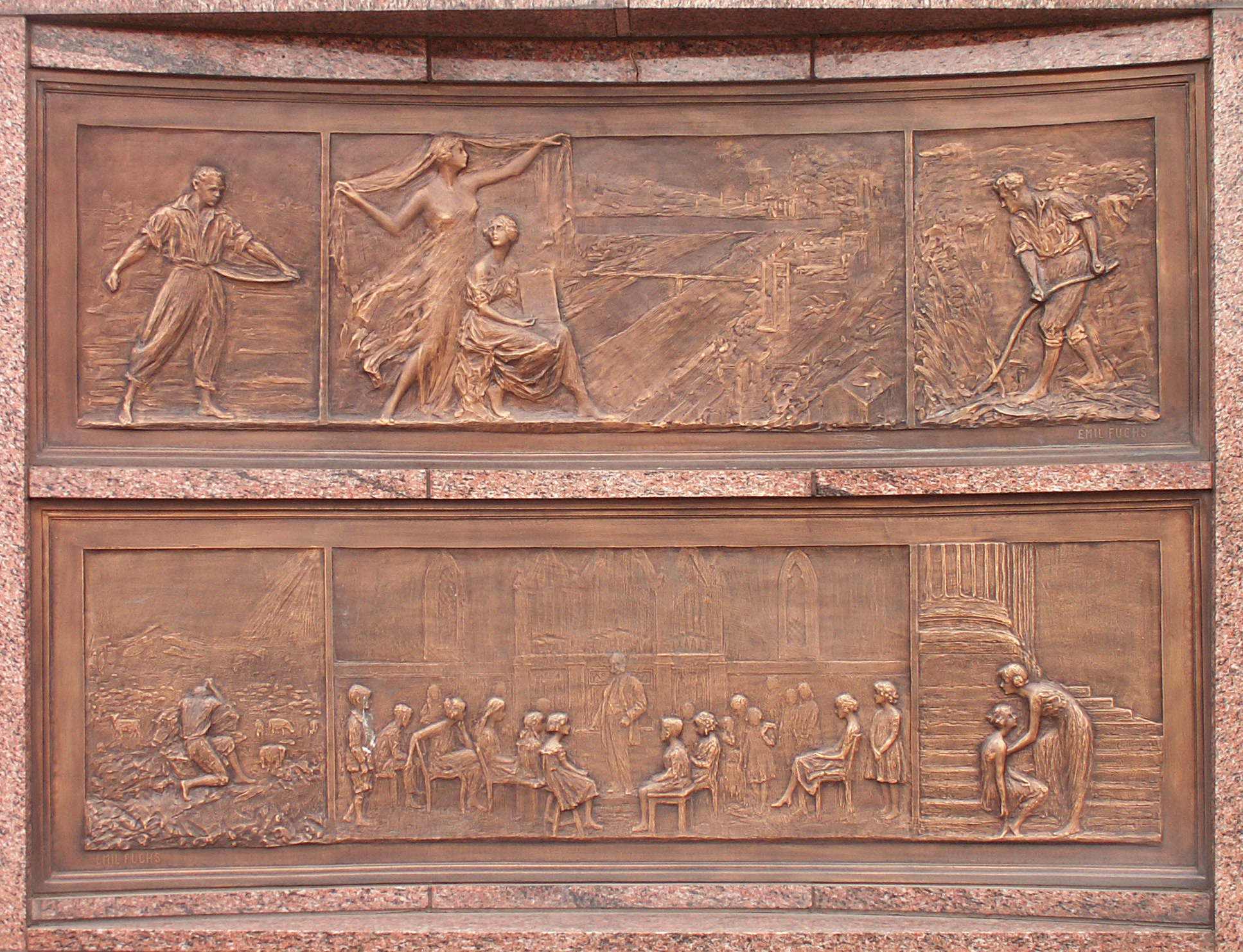
Detail of the H. J. Heinz Memorial Plaza

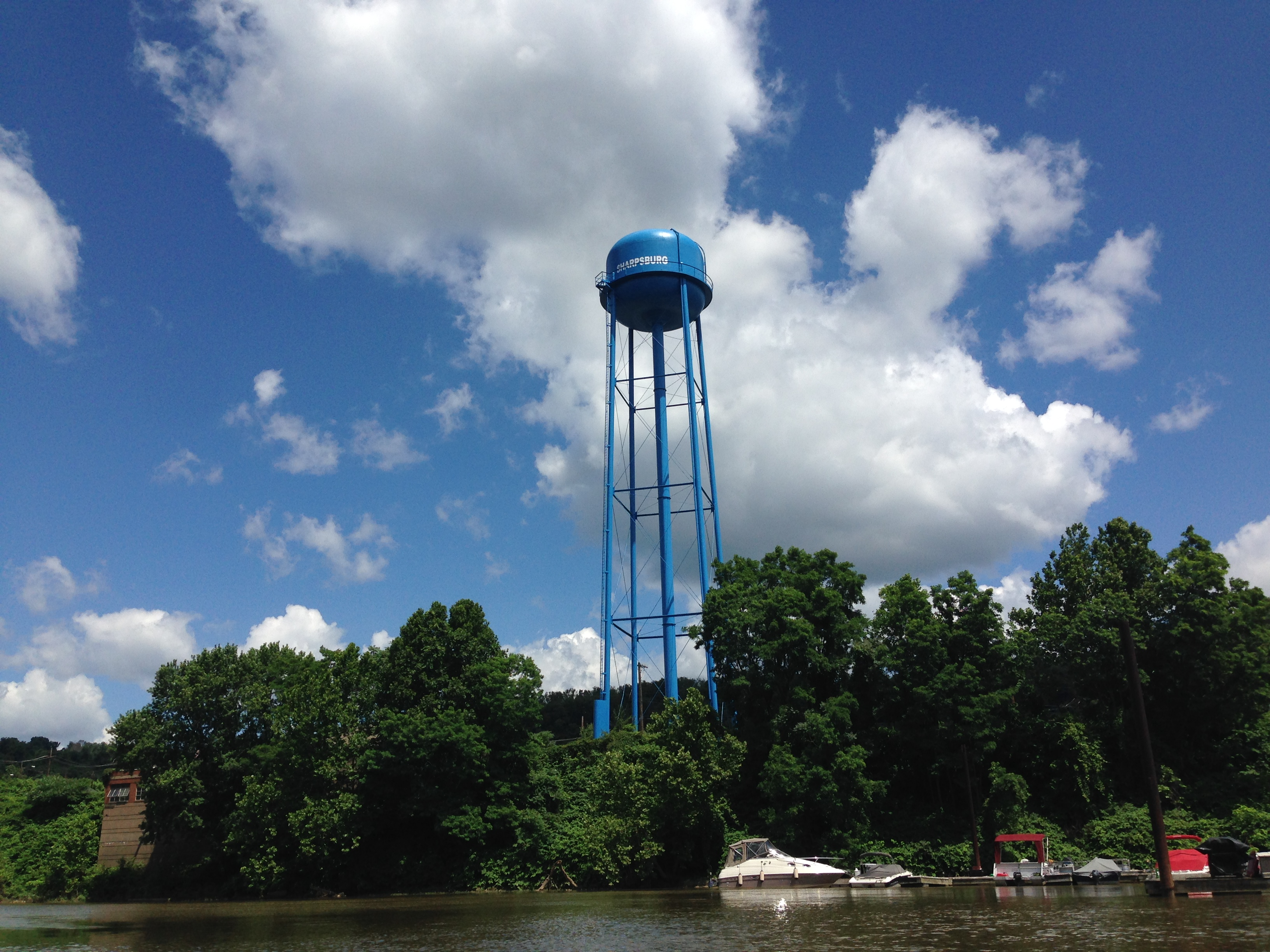
The Sharpsburg Water Tower as viewed from the Allegheny River.

Sharpsburg is a borough in Allegheny County, Pennsylvania, United States, 5 miles (8 km) northeast of downtown Pittsburgh, along the Allegheny River. In 1900, nearly 7,000 people lived here; in 1920, the population peaked at just over 8,900 people. The population was 3,187 at the 2020 census.

In the past, it had a rolling mill, foundries, machine shops, and manufacturers of varnish, brick, glass, lumber products, wire, hair, felt, and lubricating oil. In January 1869, the H. J. Heinz Company was founded in Sharpsburg as Heinz Noble & Company to manufacture and sell bricks.

== Geography ==
Sharpsburg is located at 40°29′43″N 79°55′44″W (40.495368, -79.928991).

According to the United States Census Bureau, the borough has a total area of 0.6 square miles (1.6 km^{2}), of which 0.5 square miles (1.3 km^{2}) is land and 0.2 square miles (0.52 km^{2}), or 26.15%, is water.

=== Surrounding and adjacent neighborhoods ===
Sharpsburg has five land borders, including Etna to the west, Shaler Township to the northwest, two of the five non-contiguous areas of O'Hara Township to the north and southeast, and Aspinwall to the east. To the south, across the Allegheny River via 62nd Street Bridge, are the Pittsburgh neighborhoods of Upper Lawrenceville and Morningside.

== Demographics ==
Historical population
Census	Pop.	Note	%±
1850	1,229		—
1860	1,436		16.8%
1870	2,176		51.5%
1880	3,466		59.3%
1890	4,898		41.3%
1900	6,842		39.7%
1910	8,153		19.2%
1920	8,921		9.4%
1930	8,642		−3.1%
1940	8,202		−5.1%
1950	7,296		−11.0%
1960	6,096		−16.4%
1970	5,453		−10.5%
1980	4,351		−20.2%
1990	3,781		−13.1%
2000	3,594		−4.9%
2010	3,446		−4.1%
2020	3,187		−7.5%

=== 2020 census ===
As of the 2020 census, Sharpsburg had a population of 3,187. The median age was 40.9 years. 16.3% of residents were under the age of 18 and 19.3% of residents were 65 years of age or older. For every 100 females there were 93.9 males, and for every 100 females age 18 and over there were 91.1 males age 18 and over.

100.0% of residents lived in urban areas, while 0.0% lived in rural areas.

There were 1,614 households in Sharpsburg, of which 19.7% had children under the age of 18 living in them. Of all households, 21.5% were married-couple households, 29.6% were households with a male householder and no spouse or partner present, and 39.7% were households with a female householder and no spouse or partner present. About 45.9% of all households were made up of individuals and 17.3% had someone living alone who was 65 years of age or older.

There were 1,851 housing units, of which 12.8% were vacant. The homeowner vacancy rate was 2.9% and the rental vacancy rate was 6.2%.

Racial composition as of the 2020 census
Race	Number	Percent
White	2,503	78.5%
Black or African American	373	11.7%
American Indian and Alaska Native	5	0.2%
Asian	60	1.9%
Native Hawaiian and Other Pacific Islander	0	0.0%
Some other race	48	1.5%
Two or more races	198	6.2%
Hispanic or Latino (of any race)	115	3.6%

=== 2000 census ===
As of the 2000 census, there were 3,594 people, 1,748 households, and 893 families residing in the borough. The population density was 7,393.8 inhabitants per square mile (2,854.8/km^{2}). There were 1,911 housing units at an average density of 3,931.4 per square mile (1,517.9/km^{2}). The racial makeup of the borough was 93.74% White, 3.81% African American, 0.03% Native American, 0.64% Asian, 0.06% Pacific Islander, 0.36% from other races, and 1.36% from two or more races. Hispanic or Latino of any race were 2.11% of the population.

There were 1,748 households, out of which 22.3% had children under the age of 18 living with them, 29.5% were married couples living together, 16.3% had a female householder with no husband present, and 48.9% were non-families. Of all households, 42.9% were made up of individuals, and 20.3% had someone living alone who was 65 years of age or older. The average household size was 2.03 and the average family size was 2.80.

In the borough the population was spread out, with 20.1% under the age of 18, 7.1% from 18 to 24, 28.5% from 25 to 44, 22.0% from 45 to 64, and 22.3% who were 65 years of age or older. The median age was 42 years. For every 100 females, there were 82.0 males. For every 100 females age 18 and over, there were 75.6 males.

The median income for a household in the borough was $22,828, and the median income for a family was $30,500. Males had a median income of $27,396 versus $22,238 for females. The per capita income for the borough was $15,698. About 14.0% of families and 16.6% of the population were below the poverty line, including 22.8% of those under age 18 and 14.7% of those age 65 or over.

== Education ==
Sharpsburg is served by the Fox Chapel Area School District. High-school aged students attend the Fox Chapel Area High School, middle-school aged students attend Dorseyville Middle School, and elementary-aged students attend Kerr Elementary School.

In 2017, the Fox Chapel Area School District was ranked the number two school district in the Pittsburgh region and number six in the Commonwealth.

== History ==
=== Guyasuta and the Seneca People ===
The Borough of Sharpsburg is located along the Allegheny River just over 5 miles (8 km) outside of downtown Pittsburgh. Sharpsburg has a rich history dating back to the 18th century when the Seneca people settled into the area. One Seneca in particular, Guyasuta, has a special connection to the community.

Guyasuta was a strong warrior and skilled hunter. He accompanied George Washington as a hunter guide with his party in 1753. When the two met again in Ohio 17 years later, General Washington greeted him with warmth and affection. In 1758, Guyasuta was involved in a bitter battle at Grant's Hill, where the Allegheny County Courthouse stands today. In the early 1760s, Guyasuta sought peace with the British Army. Guyasuta's peace efforts culminated in a peace treaty, in which the government received a tract of land in what is now western Pennsylvania. General James O'Hara, who had purchased a portion of the river land, donated a small portion of it, where Sharpsburg is today, to Guyasuta.

=== James Sharp and the initial settlement ===
In 1826, a man named James Sharp rode into this area and purchased over 257 acres (1.04 km^{2}) of land for $1,337.37 in what was then Indiana Township, building a log cabin for his wife, Isabella L. Sharp. The original deed, recorded on October 10, 1826, can be found in the Allegheny County Department of Real Estate at deed book volume 35(K2), page 156. Opening the land to settlers, Sharp built a school and church while continuing to donate his land for the growing needs of the community. On December 14, 1841, the borough applied for incorporation, and received its charter March 14, 1842. The charter was recorded on March 26, 1842.

James Sharp was born near Chambersburg, Franklin County, Pennsylvania on February 10, 1784, of Scottish descent. His colonial ancestor and grandfather was Captain James Sharp (Third Battalion, Pennsylvania Regiment), a veteran of the Forbes Campaign. Captain Sharp was present in 1758 at the capture of Fort Duquesne and served under Gen. Hugh Mercer and Col. William Clapham. His father, Matthew Sharp, was a veteran of the Revolutionary War, having served as a private in the Eighth Battalion, Cumberland County, Pennsylvania Militia. In 1780 he married Elizabeth (Lindsay) Culbertson and together they had three children: Rosana, James, and Mary.

With his family, young Sharp moved to Pittsburgh in 1797 and remained in Pittsburgh until 1826 when he purchased land at Sheriff's Sale, formerly owned by Gen. John Wilkins, "being number Thirteen in Cunninghams district containing two hundred and fifty seven acres and eighty seven perches on which are a square log dwelling, a good orchard and about fifty acres of cleared land, with fine meadows, a coal bank, and one of the best springs in the County." Sharp moved permanently to the land, part of which would later become the Borough of Sharpsburg. Sharp's first marriage to Sarah Thompson ended with the death of Thompson a few years after their nuptials. He later married Isabella Stockman, with whom he had six children. During his lifetime, Sharp was described as a gentleman: courteous in manners, affable in disposition, and generous in hospitality. Sharp was an abolitionist, a zealous advocate for universal education, a member of the temperance movement, and a member of the Presbyterian Church. Sharp died on March 12, 1861.

=== Industry ===
Since its incorporation, Sharpsburg became an industrial town, manufacturing iron, brick and glass while goods were transported through the canal that bisected the borough, along with the Allegheny River. When railroads became the preferred mode of transportation for that time, Sharpsburg continued to thrive as thousands came for the plethora of job opportunities available.

=== H. J. Heinz Company ===
One of the most well-known industries that had its beginnings in Sharpsburg was the H. J. Heinz Company. The Heinz glass works in Sharpsburg once manufactured all of the glassware for Heinz products. In 1869, Heinz began creating and bottling his first horseradish in the kitchen of his Sharpsburg residence. This house is the place where it all began. Shortly thereafter, the house became Heinz’s first factory. Although he moved his company down the Allegheny along the North Shore of Pittsburgh, he was very gracious to the people of Sharpsburg until his death, donating gifts to the community that was his family home for many years. One of these included the life-sized statue of Guyasuta that was installed at the intersection of Main and North Canal streets. The statue has twice been hit by automobiles—the first occurrence in 1930 and the second occurrence in 1988. Each incident resulted in the destruction and subsequent replacement of the statue.

=== A town divided ===
Less than a century ago, Sharpsburg was divided into two sections because of a railroad track that went through the location where Kennedy Park currently sits. There were two fire departments, one on each side of the tracks. There were two schools on each side of the track as well, one "up street" and one "down street". Once the railroad tracks weren’t used anymore, the railcars sat vacant on the tracks. The Junior Chamber of Commerce in Sharpsburg went to the railroad company as well as the Heinz family to try to change something about this. The Heinz family said they would help build a park if it was used for recreation purposes only. The park was built around the time when President John F. Kennedy was assassinated, and that is why the area was named Kennedy Park.

== Government and politics ==
=== Office of the mayor ===
The executive of Sharpsburg is the mayor. The mayor is elected to four-year terms and controls all aspects of public safety in the borough. In the event of a tie on council, the mayor reserves a voting privilege.

=== Council ===
The legislative arm of Sharpsburg Borough is the Borough Council, which is composed of seven elected officials, each to a four-year term. Elections to Council are divided into classes, with four councilors elected in one class, and three elected two years subsequent.

=== Magisterial District Judge 05-2-04 ===
Sharpsburg is also home to the area Magisterial District Judge (MDJ 05-2-04). The Magisterial District Judge is office is vacant. The district judge has jurisdiction over Aspinwall, Blawnox, Fox Chapel, Indiana, O'Hara, and Sharpsburg. The Magisterial District Judge is an elected position, for a term of six years.

=== Commonwealth ===
Sharpsburg is represented in the Pennsylvania House of Representatives by State Rep. Mandy Steele, 33rd district. The borough is represented in the Pennsylvania State Senate by State Senator Lindsey M. Williams, 38th district.

=== Federal ===
Sharpsburg is represented in the United States House of Representatives by Congressman Christopher R. Deluzio, Pennsylvania's 17th District. Sharpsburg is represented in the United States Senate by Senators David McCormick and John Fetterman.

=== Presidential elections ===
Presidential election results
Year	Republican	Democratic	Third parties
2020	37% 613	61% 1,010	1% 24
2016	38% 522	59% 802	3% 25
2012	36% 473	63% 827	1% 20

== Public safety ==
=== Police ===
The Sharpsburg Borough Police Department (3500 units) formed in 1883. The composition of the Department includes the Chief of Police and five full-time patrolmen. Three vehicles, all Ford Explorers, are used in day-to-day operations by the department. Police headquarters is located in the Municipal Building at 1611 Main Street, in the Borough.

=== EMS ===
The borough's EMS services are provided by Parkview EMS. Parkview also serves O'Hara Township and Blawnox Borough.

=== Fire ===
The Sharpsburg Borough Volunteer Fire Department (Station 265) has continuously served the borough since it was first organized on August 29, 1871, with the creation of the Hook and Ladder Company by W. C. Meyer. In 1886, Sharpsburg Borough Council established the position of fire chief, appointing W. C. Meyer to the position.

In 1928, the fire department reorganized into two companies—Fire Company No. 1 and Fire Company No. 2. The need for two fire companies in a borough of Sharpsburg's size was necessitated by the Pennsylvania Railroad, which split the town in two. In the event of a fire during which a train was passing through town, one company could always respond without delay.

The current fire department is located at 1611 Main Street, adjacent to the Municipal Building. The ranks are made up of approximately twenty-six firemen and women, plus the fire chief. The department's vehicles include one engine, one quint, and a squad.

Sharpsburg Vol. Fire Dept. Truck 265.	Sharpsburg Vol. Fire Dept. Engine 265.	Sharpsburg Vol. Fire Dept. Squad 265.

== Public utilities ==
=== Water ===
The Hampton Shaler Water Authority (HSWA) provides water to the borough. HSWA serves 23,600 customers across all or parts of ten municipalities in Allegheny County, north of the City of Pittsburgh. HSWA was incorporated in 2011 and started operations in January 2012 as the merged entity of Hampton Township Municipal Authority and the Shaler Water Department.

HSWA typically pumps, treats, and distributes 5 to 6 million gallons of water per day to their customers. They maintain over 314 miles of distribution mainlines and appurtenances, ten water storage tanks, twelve pumping wells, and one water treatment plant.

=== Waste water ===
The Allegheny County Sanitary Authority (ALCOSAN) collects and treats waste water from the borough. Located along the Ohio River on Pittsburgh’s Northside, ALCOSAN provides wastewater treatment services to 83 communities. ALCOSAN's 59-acre treatment plant is one of the largest wastewater treatment facilities in the Ohio River Valley, processing up to 250 million gallons of wastewater daily.

=== Refuse ===
Waste Management is the refuse collector for the borough and conducts curbside pickup weekly.

=== Recycling ===
Curbside single stream recycling is provided by Waste Management to Borough residents. Residents are able to recycle aluminum, glass, metals cans, plastics, mixed paper, and cardboard with weekly pickup. Recycling was made available to Sharpsburg residents starting in early 2023.

== Religion ==
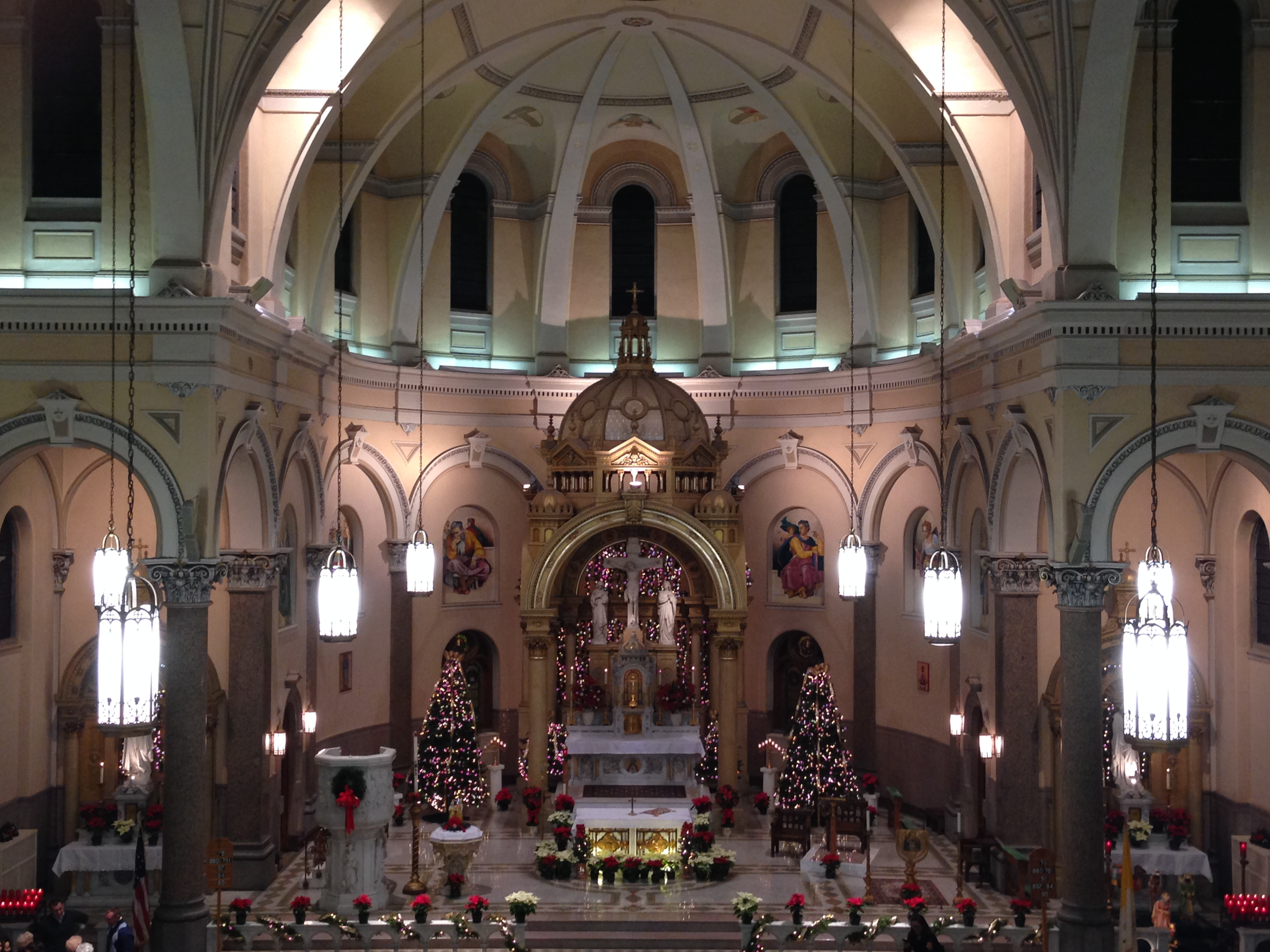
St. Mary Church altar during the Christmas Season

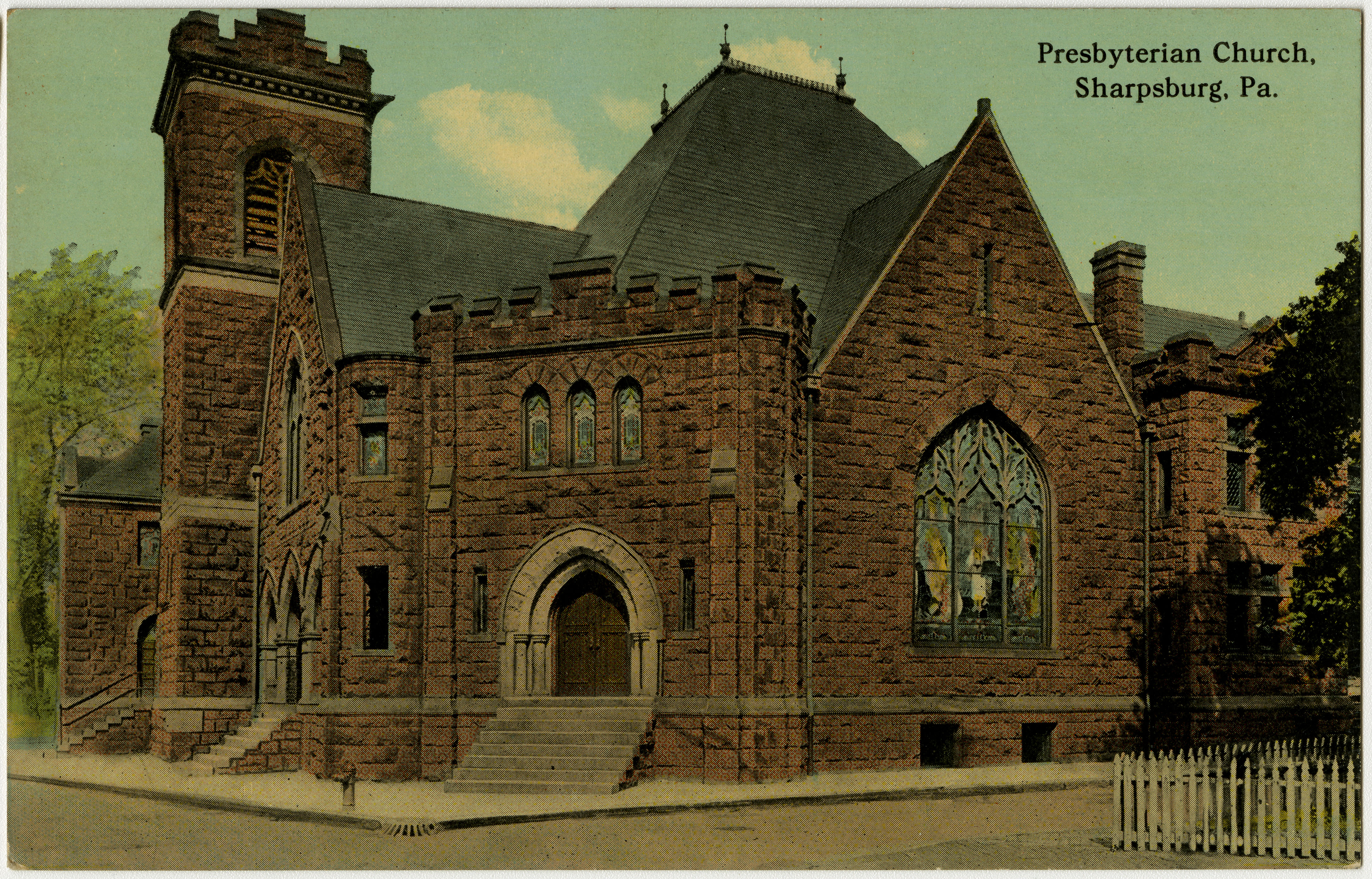
The Sharpsburg Presbyterian Church located at 13th and North Canal Streets, now the location of the Northern Area Multi-Service Center.

Located within Sharpsburg are numerous churches and other religious gathering places. Most notably, though, in the borough, is the Catholic community. Three churches, St. Mary Church, Madonna of Jerusalem Church, and St. John Cantius Church, form the Saint Juan Diego Parish. Bishop David Zubik of the Diocese of Pittsburgh created the parish in 2009, at the behest of the parishioners, who called for the three churches to form one parish. Saint Juan Diego, a Native American from Mexico, was chosen as the name of the parish because of Sharpsburg's ties with Native Americans, specifically Guyasuta and the Senecas.

In addition, Grace Methodist Church, Mt. Olive Baptist Church, First English Lutheran Church, First Evangelical Lutheran Church and the Sharpsburg Family Worship Center call Sharpsburg home. The basement of the Mt. Olive church was the artistic inspiration to urban lyricist Mark D. Lombardi during his 1991 recording sessions of his gold album Locked Half Cocked and Loaded.

== Sharpsburg Community Library ==
In summer 2015, the Sharpsburg Community Library, a branch of the Cooper-Siegel Library, reopened after a one-million dollar renovation funded through state grants and private donations. The renovated library expanded its size and design, in addition to adding to its circulating collection. The reopening was organized by Borough residents, the Sharpsburg council, and donations from various philanthropies. For its design, the library was awarded a 2015 Certificate of Merit from the American Institute of Architects Pittsburgh chapter.

The library is also home to the Sharpsburg Community Garden, which features numerous raised beds for residents to grow and nurture vegetable gardens.

Allegheny County Executive Rich Fitzgerald speaks at the reopening of the Sharpsburg Community Library.	Sharpsburg Community Library.	Sharpsburg Community Library.	Sharpsburg Community Library.	Sharpsburg Community Library.
Sharpsburg Community Library.	Sharpsburg Community Library.	Sharpsburg Community Library.	Sharpsburg Community Garden	Sharpsburg Community Garden.

== Recreation ==
=== Parks ===
The borough is home to five parks: James Sharp Landing, Heinz Memorial Field, Kennedy Park, Kenneth D. Curley Memorial Park, and Children's Park located at 16th and Main Streets.

Heinz Memorial Field is home to a hockey rink, two basketball courts and a baseball field. In addition, numerous play sets are located at Heinz Memorial Field for children.

Kennedy Park is located in the center of the borough. It is a large swath of land that is dedicated to the Guyasuta Days Festival, held annually in August. Kennedy Park is outfitted with outdoor facilities, including a kitchen area and seating. Also located at Kennedy Park is one large BasketBall court

Children's Park is open in the spring and summer months. There is a water fountain within the park that is used by children in the hot summer months to find an escape. In addition, the park is home to numerous swings, carousels, teeter totter, basketball court, picnic area and other play sets.

Heinz Memorial Field.	Kennedy Park, located in the Canal District.	James Sharp Landing.
Memorial celebrating the Bicentennial of American Revolution at Kennedy Park.	Memorial celebrating the 150th Anniversary of James Sharp settling Sharpsburg.	Memorial celebrating the 50th Anniversary of the Sharpsburgh-Aspinwall Rotary Club (sic).

=== James Sharp Landing ===
Sharpsburg is also home to a free-of-charge boat launch. Located at 13th and Main Streets, the James Sharp Landing serves as a spring, summer, and fall escape for all. Built in recent years through the efforts of borough council as well as state and federal support, the Landing attracts to Sharpsburg a wide variety of individuals and groups looking to enjoy the outdoors. The Landing is home to a boat launch, a thirty-foot fishing pier, a pavilion, a gazebo, and a kayak launch. Additionally, the Landing also hosts the annual Sharpsburg Fishing Derby, attracting hundreds of anglers looking to capture the grand prize, which has reached $40,000.00 in recent years.

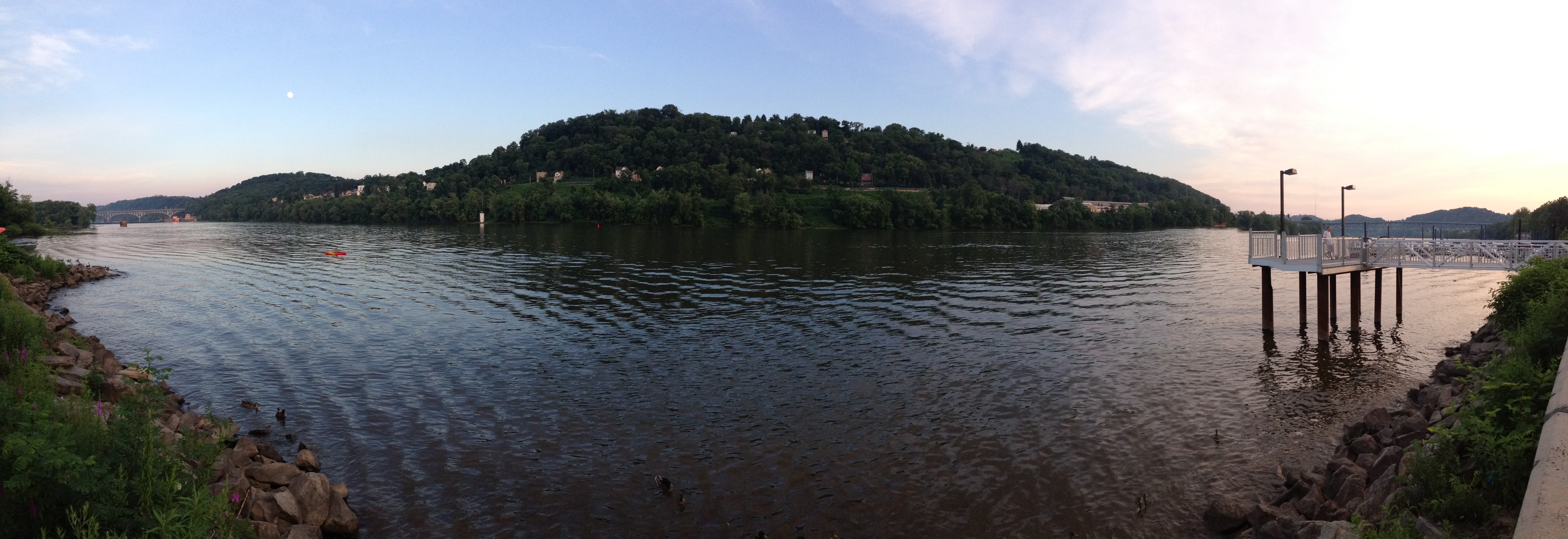
View of the Allegheny River from James Sharp Landing.

The Linden Gymnasium/Sharpsburg Recreation Center

The Linden Gymnasium/Sharpsburg Recreation Center originally served as the gymnasium for the local Young Mens Christian Association (YMCA), constructed in the late 1880s through the early 1890s. The Sharpsburg School District later purchased the gym and repurposed it for use by the Sharpsburg High School until the Sharpsburg School District merged with the Fox Chapel Area School District in 1970. The Fox Chapel Area School District sold the building to the borough in 1982 and it is operated by the Sharpsburg Recreation Committee, who have a lease with the borough to operate and manage the building. The Linden Gym is home to the Sharpsburg Wolves and Junior Wolves, local club teams, and also host to the annual John "Tip" Veltri Basketball Tournament.

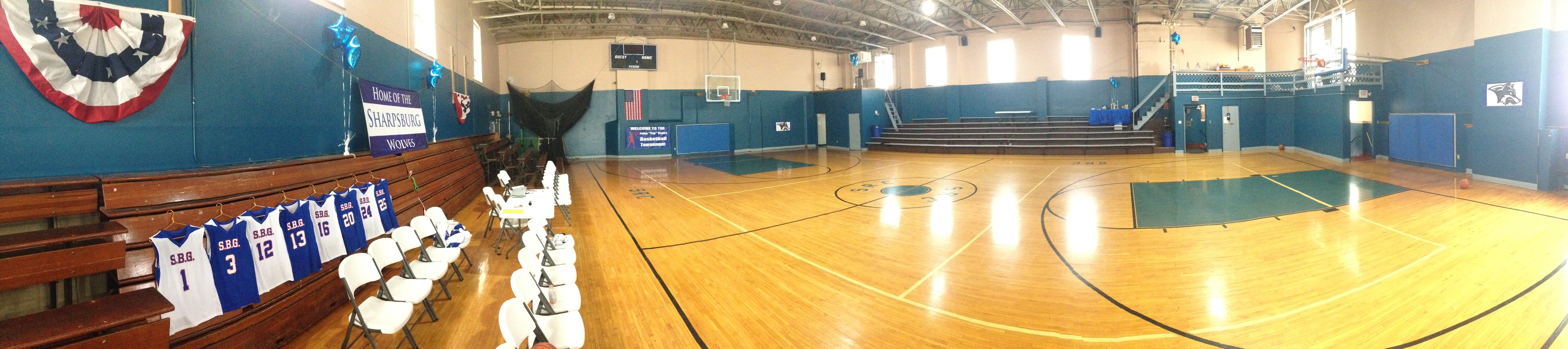
The Linden Gym, home of Sharpsburg Recreation Center.

== Notable people ==
Guyasuta, Chief of the Seneca Indians.

Hon. Frederick H. Collier, Brevet Brigadier General U.S. Army, Allegheny County District Attorney, and President Judge of the Allegheny County Court of Common Pleas.

Hon. John D. Shafer, founding Dean of the Pitt Law School and President Judge of the Allegheny County Court of Common Pleas.

Henry J. Heinz, founder of the H. J. Heinz Company.

Lawrence Saint, stained glass artist.

Don Celender, American conceptual artist and professor.

Robert D. Fleming, Pennsylvania State Senator.

Jim Miller, American football player.

Hon. Robert C. Gallo, Judge of the Allegheny County Court of Common Pleas.

Preceded by Aspinwall	Bordering communities of Pittsburgh	Succeeded by Etna
