= Reserve Township, Pennsylvania =

Township in Pennsylvania, US

Reserve Township
- Township
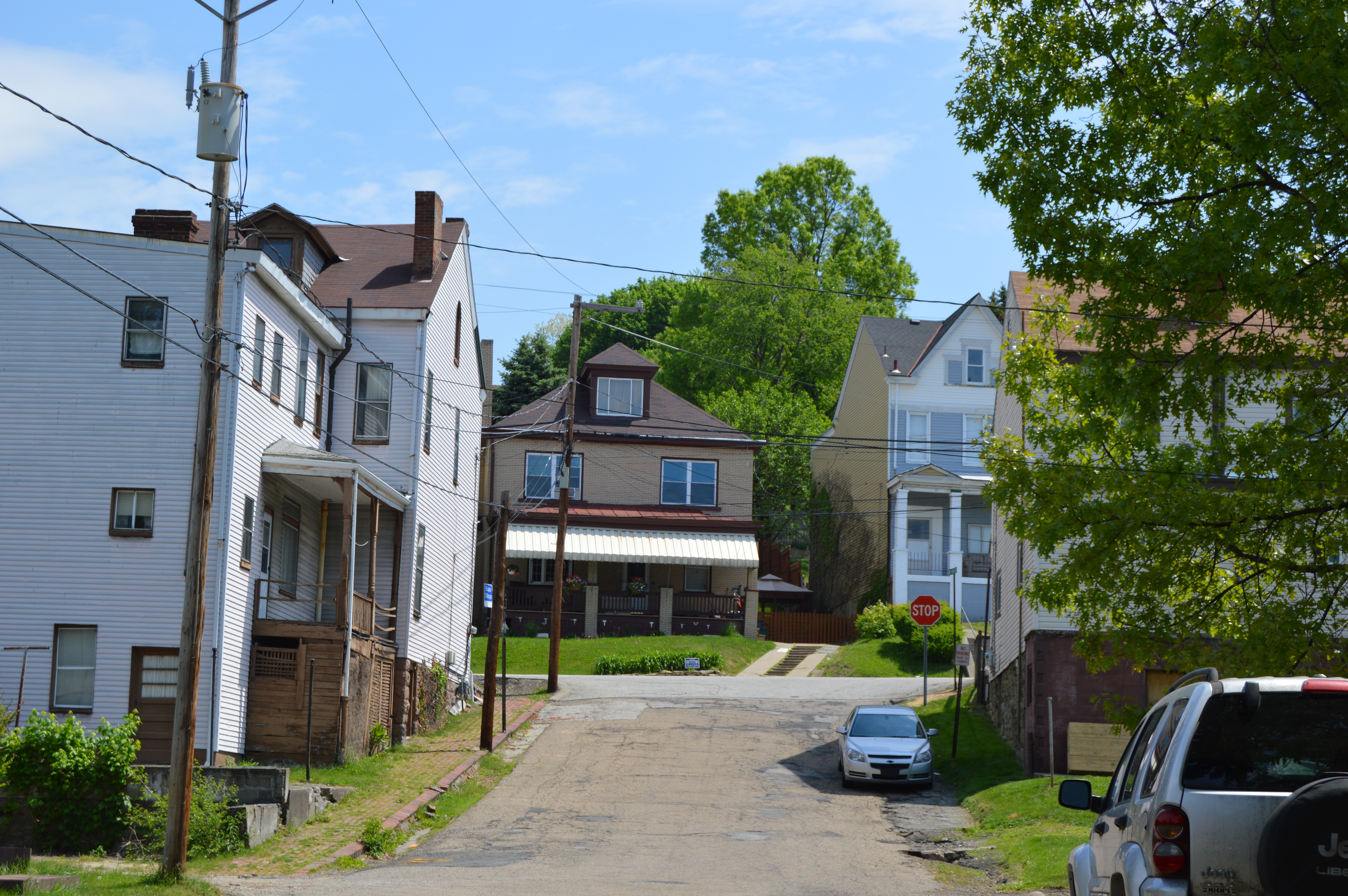
- Mount Troy Road and Homestead Street

- Location in Allegheny County and state of Pennsylvania
- Coordinates: 40°28′42″N 79°59′16″W
- Country: United States
- State: Pennsylvania
- County: Allegheny

Area
  - Total: 2.06 sq mi (5.34 km^{2})
  - Land: 2.06 sq mi (5.34 km^{2})
  - Water: 0 sq mi (0.00 km^{2})

Population (2010)
  - Total: 3,333
  - Estimate (2018): 3,234
  - Density: 1,585.4/sq mi (612.11/km^{2})
- Time zone: UTC-5 (Eastern)
  - Summer (DST): UTC-4 (EDT)
- ZIP codes: 15209, 15214, 15212, 15232,15202
- Area code: 412
- FIPS code: 42-003-64240

Reserve Township is a township in Allegheny County, Pennsylvania, United States. The population was 3,333 at the 2010 census.

== History ==
The land that became Reserve Township was part of a 3,000-acre (1,200 ha) tract that the Pennsylvania General Assembly reserved in 1783 for state use, from which the township later took its name. Surveyed by Alexander McClean in 1785, the tract extended at least one mile inland from the Allegheny and Ohio rivers opposite Fort Pitt, with boundaries that included part of Girty's Run and land opposite the mouth of Chartiers Creek. Before its sale by the state, the tract was subdivided by surveyor David Redick, who described its rugged topography in a 1788 letter to Benjamin Franklin:

There is some pretty low ground on the rivers Ohio and Alleghenia, but there is but a small proportion of dry land which appears anyway valuable either for timber or soil, but especially for soil; it abounds with high hills, deep hollows, almost inaccessible to a surveyor. I am of opinion that if the inhabitants of the moon are capable of receiving the same advantages from the earth which we do from their world—I say, if it be so—this same far-famed tract of land would afford a variety of beautiful lunar spots not unworthy the eye of a philosopher.

Among the earliest recorded settlers were George Brickle, who was reportedly captured by Indigenous people prior to 1800, as well as John Tom, John Wilson, and George Myers. Reserve Township was formally established in October 1835 following a petition from residents of Ross Township living within the reserved tract.

By the late 19th century, the township's largely German-American farming community had developed a thriving market-gardening economy despite the challenges of its hilly terrain.

== Geography ==
Reserve Township is located at 40°28′42″N 79°59′16″W (40.478369, -79.987872).

According to the United States Census Bureau, the township has a total area of 2.0 square miles (5.2 km^{2}), all land.

== Demographics ==
Historical population
Census	Pop.	Note	%±
1850	1,160		—
1860	3,030		161.2%
1870	1,600		−47.2%
1880	1,786		11.6%
1890	2,941		64.7%
1900	3,095		5.2%
1910	2,024		−34.6%
1920	2,605		28.7%
1930	3,108		19.3%
1940	3,094		−0.5%
1950	3,533		14.2%
1960	4,230		19.7%
1970	4,151		−1.9%
1980	4,306		3.7%
1990	3,866		−10.2%
2000	3,856		−0.3%
2010	3,333		−13.6%
2018 (est.)	3,234		−3.0%

As of the census of 2000, there were 3,856 people, 1,547 households, and 1,087 families residing in the township. The population density was 1,934.3 inhabitants per square mile (746.8/km^{2}). There were 1,605 housing units at an average density of 805.1 units per square mile (310.9 units/km^{2}). The racial makeup of the township was 97.90% White, 1.35% African American, 0.18% Native American, 0.29% Asian, 0.16% from other races, and 0.13% from two or more races. Hispanic or Latino of any race were 0.44% of the population.

There were 1,547 households, out of which 29.5% had children under the age of 18 living with them, 56.8% were married couples living together, 9.5% had a female householder with no husband present, and 29.7% were non-families. 25.1% of all households were made up of individuals, and 11.8% had someone living alone who was 65 years of age or older. The average household size was 2.49 and the average family size was 3.02.

In the township the population was spread out, with 22.3% under the age of 18, 6.9% from 18 to 24, 28.5% from 25 to 44, 23.9% from 45 to 64, and 18.5% who were 65 years of age or older. The median age was 41 years. For every 100 females there were 93.7 males. For every 100 females age 18 and over, there were 89.4 males.

The median income for a household in the township was $39,201, and the median income for a family was $43,298. Males had a median income of $36,541 versus $25,688 for females. The per capita income for the township was $17,676. About 5.6% of families and 8.4% of the population were below the poverty line, including 10.8% of those under age 18 and 11.2% of those age 65 or over.

== Government and politics ==
Presidential Elections Results
Year	Republican	Democratic	Third Parties
2020	45% 956	52% 1,106	1% 34
2016	48% 866	50% 907	2% 27
2012	48% 844	51% 887	1% 25

== Education ==
Reserve Township is served by the Shaler Area School District.

== Recreation ==
Most of the permanently protected 155-acre Girty's Woods, owned and managed by the Allegheny Land Trust, lies within Reserve Township. The green space contains wooded slopes, open fields, and trails, and plays a role in reducing flooding in the Girty's Run watershed.

Preceded by Millvale	Bordering communities of Pittsburgh	Succeeded by West View
