= Shaler Area High School =

Coordinates: 40.5153°N 79.9746°W

Location
- 382 Wible Run Road; Shaler Township, Pennsylvania 15219; United States

Information
- Established: 1971
- School district: Shaler Area School District
- CEEB code: 391550
- Principal: JoAnne Townsend (interim)
- Teaching staff: 102.60 (FTE)
- Grades: 9-12
- Enrollment: 1,174 (2023-2024)
- Student to teacher ratio: 11.44
- Campus type: Suburban
- Colors: Blue and white with red as a secondary.
- Athletics: PIAA class AAA/AAAA
- Nickname: Titans
- Rival: North Hills
- Accreditation: Middle States Association of Colleges and Schools
- Newspaper: The Oracle
- Yearbook: The Spectrum
- Website: Shaler Area High School

Shaler Area High School is a high school in Shaler Township, Pennsylvania (with a Pittsburgh mailing address). The school employed 124 teachers yielding a student teacher ratio of 1:14. As of the 2024–2025 school year, the students' race/ethnicity breakdown was: 1,015 White, 43 Hispanic, 39 Black, 17 Asian, 1 American Indian/Alaska Native, and 45 Two or More Races. The gender breakdown was 579 male and 581 female.

== History ==
Shaler Area High School was established in 1971 from the court-ordered merger of Etna borough, Reserve Township, Millvale borough, and Shaler Township high schools. The current building was constructed during 1978 and 1979.

In 2006, the school board approved a plan to regroup grades within its schools, including moving ninth grade students to the high school. $30 million in renovations were budgeted to create space for classrooms and to enlarge other school facilities.

== Sports Awards ==
- 2025 WPIAL Class 5A Baseball Champions
- 2023 WPIAL Class 5A Baseball Champions
- 2023 PIAA State Class 5A Baseball Champions

== Notable alumni ==
- Anne Brodsky (class of 1983), author
- Tom Corbett (class of 1964), former Republican Attorney General (2005–2011) and Governor of Pennsylvania (2011–2015).
- Gaelen Foley, New York Times Bestselling romance novelist
- Danny Fortson (class of 1994), professional basketball player
- Art Howe, professional baseball player, manager and coach
- Ken Karcher (class of 1981), professional football player
- Steve Sciullo, former professional football player
- Ian Terry (Class of 2009), Big Brother 14 winner
- J. P. Holtz (Class of 2012), Current Tight End in the National Football League for the New Orleans Saints.
