= Hampton Township School District (Pennsylvania) =

School district in Pennsylvania, USA

Coordinates: 40.59127°N 79.95265°W

Address
- 4591 School Drive Allison Park, Allegheny County, Pennsylvania, 15101; United States

District information
- Type: Public
- Grades: K-12

Other information
- Website: www.ht-sd.org

Hampton Township School District is a midsize, urban/suburban public school district operating in Allegheny County, Pennsylvania. The district serves only the residents of Hampton Township, Western Pennsylvania, USA. The district encompasses approximately 16 square miles (41 km^{2}). According to 2000 federal census data, Hampton Township School District served a resident population of 17,526 people. Per the US Census Bureau in 2010, the population rose to 18,367 people. The district graduated its first class in 1943.

In 2009, Hampton Township School District residents’ per capita income was $29,071, while the median family income was $67,367. In the Commonwealth, the median family income was $49,501 and the United States median family income was $49,445, in 2010. By 2013, the median household income in the United States rose to $52,100.

Hampton's mascot is the talbot, which is an extinct hunting dog. It is also the only high school in the United States with the Talbot as their mascot.

The district operates five public schools: Hampton High School, Hampton Middle School, and three elementary schools: Central, Poff, and Wyland. Hampton High School students may choose to attend A. W. Beattie Career Center for training.

== Extracurriculars ==
The Hampton Township School District offers a wide variety of clubs, activities and an extensivesports program.

=== Sports ===
The district funds:

Varsity

Boys

- Baseball - AAAAA
- Basketball- AAAAA
- Cross Country - AAA
- Football - AAAA
- Golf - AAA
- Indoor Track and Field - AAAA
- Lacrosse - AAAA
- Soccer - AAA
- Swimming and Diving - AAA
- Tennis - AAA
- Track and Field - AAA
- Wrestling - AAA

Girls

- Basketball - AAAAA
- Cross Country - AAA
- Gymnastics - AAAA
- Indoor Track and Field - AAAA
- Lacrosse - AAAA
- Soccer (Fall) - AAA
- Softball - AAAAA
- Swimming and Diving - AAA
- Girls' Tennis - AAA
- Track and Field - AAA
- Volleyball - AAA

Middle School Sports:

Boys

- Basketball
- Cross Country
- Football
- Track and Field
- Wrestling

Girls

- Basketball
- Cross Country
- Softball
- Track and Field
- Volleyball
- Wrestling

According to PIAA directory July 2013
