= Girtys Run =

Tributary of the Allegheny River in Pennsylvania

Girty's Run

Location
- Country: United States
- State: Pennsylvania
- County: Allegheny

Physical characteristics
- Source
  - coordinates: 40.5664568°N 80.0358894°W
- Mouth
  - coordinates: 40.4784022°N 79.9686637°W
  - elevation: 738 ft (225 m)
- Basin size: 13.4 m^{2}

Basin features
- River system: Allegheny River

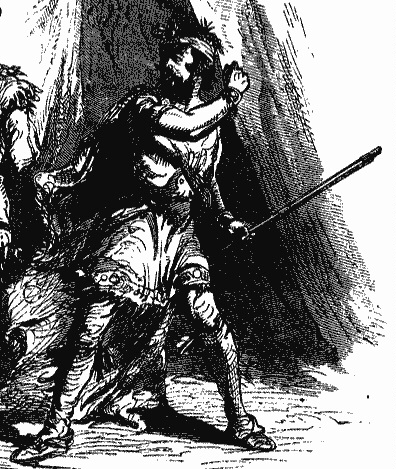
Simon Girty, namesake of Girty's Run Creek, as depicted in 1928 in "the White Savage," by Thomas Boyd . Note that this depiction was based on oral tradition. Simon Girty: Wilderness Warrior contains a more accurate depiction based on firsthand accounts.

Girty's Run is a tributary of the Allegheny River located in Allegheny County in the U.S. state of Pennsylvania.

The creek is named after the Girty family who settled in the area. Some sources claim it was named for John Girty. Others claim it was named for Thomas Girty, brother of the famous renegade Simon Girty. However, most scholarly investigations concluded that the stream was named for Simon Girty, son of Simon Girty the Elder.

== History ==
Prior to the European colonization, the Millvale area was the starting point of the Venango Path, a Native American trail which led Lake Erie. The Seneca people hunted and fished the lands. The European Simon Girty and his father settled in the area. During a major raid by Chief Tewea of the Lenape and Captain François Coulon de Villiers of the French, Girty's stepfather, Thomas, was taken captive, tortured, and killed. Chief Guyasuta adopted Simon and assimilated him into Seneca culture. Due to his difficulty living with Europeans, Simon settled on the Venango Path near a creek which now bears his name. After fighting against the colonists in the American Revolution, Girty moved to Canada. The creek on which he settled remains Girty's Run Creek.

== Course ==
Girty's Run joins the Allegheny River at the borough of Millvale.

== See also ==
- List of rivers of Pennsylvania
- List of tributaries of the Allegheny River
