= List of Alpha Delta Sigma chapters =

Alpha Delta Sigma is an American honor fraternity for advertising. It started in 1913 at the University of Missouri, a men's professional fraternity, and absorbed Gamma Alpha Chi in 1971. It merged into the American Advertising Federation in 1973, becoming an honor society at the time.

Originally, Alpha Delta Sigma's chapters were named for prominent members of the field, prominent alumni, or members of a host institution's faculty. Following is a list of Alpha Delta Sigma chapters.

Former chapter name	Charter date	Institution	Location	Status	Ref.
John W. Jewell	November 14, 1913	University of Missouri	Columbia, Missouri	Active	(Note: This was originally the Thomas Balmer chapter; its name was changed after founding member John W. Jewell died during World War I.) (Note: Absorbed the Alpha chapter of Gamma Alpha Chi on November 2, 1971, with the national merger of the two fraternities.)
Desha Breckinridge	1914	University of Kentucky	Lexington, Kentucky	Active	
Charles H. Dennis	April 1914	University of Illinois Urbana-Champaign	Urbana, Illinois	Active	(Note: Absorbed the Delta chapter of Gamma Alpha Chi on November 2, 1971, with the national merger of the two fraternities.)
Robert W. Jones	April 1914	University of Washington	Seattle, Washington	Inactive	(Note: Absorbed the Gamma chapter of Gamma Alpha Chi on November 2, 1971, with the national merger of the two fraternities.)
Henry Watterson	1920–1926	Georgetown College	Georgetown, Kentucky	Inactive	
Horace Greeley	1922	Dartmouth College	Hanover, New Hampshire	Inactive	
Charles Miller	1923–1926, xxxx ?	University of Michigan	Ann Arbor, Michigan	Active	
William Wigley Jr.	1924	University of Oklahoma	Norman, Oklahoma	Inactive	
Henry W. Grady	1924	Georgia Tech	Atlanta, Georgia	Inactive	
W. F. G. Thacher	1924	University of Oregon	Eugene, Oregon	Inactive	(Note: Absorbed the Zeta chapter of Gamma Alpha Chi on November 2, 1971, with the national merger of the two fraternities.)
Green	1924	Columbia University	New York City, New York	Inactive	
Bruce Barton	1925	Boston University	Boston, Massachusetts	Inactive	
L. N. Flint	1925–1928; November 2, 1971	University of Kansas	Lawrence, Kansas	Inactive	(Note: The chapter was also called Lou Holland. After going dormant, it was reactivated by the Nu chapter of Gamma Alpha Chi, with the national merger of the two fraternities.)
Ralph D. Casey	1925	University of Minnesota	Minneapolis, Minnesota	Active	(Note: This was originally called the Dean E. E. Nicholson chapter, according to the 1928 University of Minnesota Gopher, p.356.)
Arthur J. Brewster	1925	Syracuse University	Syracuse, New York	Inactive	
Herbert T. Vance	1926	Oregon State University	Corvallis, Oregon	Inactive	
Charles H. Dunker Jr.	1926–1927	Washington University in St. Louis	St. Louis, Missouri	Inactive	
Paoli A. Smith	1927	University of Alabama	Tuscaloosa, Alabama	Active	
Charles Raymond	1927	University of California, Berkeley	Berkeley, California	Inactive	
Howard Parish	1928	Washington State University	Pullman, Washington	Active	
William D. Moriarty	1928	University of Southern California	Los Angeles, California	Inactive	(Note: Absorbed the Eta chapter of Gamma Alpha Chi on November 2, 1971, with the national merger of the two fraternities.)
Orville J. Fee	1928	University of Nebraska–Lincoln	Lincoln, Nebraska	Active	(Note: Absorbed the Epsilon chapter of Gamma Alpha Chi on November 2, 1971, with the national merger of the two fraternities.)
Daniel Starch	1928	Ohio University	Athens, Ohio	Inactive	
Paul J. Thompson	1929	University of Texas at Austin	Austin, Texas	Inactive	(Note: Absorbed the Beta chapter and Alpha Nu chapter of Gamma Alpha Chi on November 2, 1971, with the national merger of the two fraternities.)
Charles C. Younggreen	1929	University of Wisconsin–Madison	Madison, Wisconsin	Inactive	(Note: Absorbed the Alpha Alpha chapter of Gamma Alpha Chi on November 2, 1971, with the national merger of the two fraternities.)
Walter B. Cole	1930	DePauw University	Greencastle, Indiana	Inactive	
Merle Sidener	1931	Butler University	Indianapolis, Indiana	Inactive	
Vergil D. Reed	1932	Indiana University Bloomington	Bloomington, Indiana	Active	(Note: Absorbed the Pi chapter of Gamma Alpha Chi on November 2, 1971, with the national merger of the two fraternities.)
George Burton Hotchkiss	1933	New York University	New York City, New York	Inactive	(Note: Absorbed the Alpha Pi chapter of Gamma Alpha Chi on November 2, 1971, with the national merger of the two fraternities.)
Cyrus H. K. Curtis	1933	Temple University	Philadelphia, Pennsylvania	Active	(Note: Absorbed the Alpha Eta chapter of Gamma Alpha Chi on November 2, 1971, with the national merger of the two fraternities.)
Benjamin Franklin	1933	Pennsylvania State University	State College, Pennsylvania	Active	
H. W. Preston Jr.	1937	Franklin & Marshall College	Lancaster, Pennsylvania	Inactive	
William B. Johns	1938	City College of New York	New York City, New York	Active	(Note: Absorbed the Sigma chapter of Gamma Alpha Chi on November 2, 1971, with the national merger of the two fraternities.)
Howard Willoughby	1940	Stanford University	Stanford, California	Inactive	
Alvin Long	1940	San Jose State University	San Jose, California	Active	(Note: Absorbed the Upsilon chapter of Gamma Alpha Chi on November 2, 1971, with the national merger of the two fraternities.)
Walter Dill Scott	1940	Northwestern University	Evanston, Illinois	Inactive	
George W. Coleman	1941	Babson College	Wellesley, Massachusetts	Inactive	
Philip Ward Burton	1947	University of Iowa	Iowa City, Iowa	Inactive	(Note: Absorbed the Lambda chapter of Gamma Alpha Chi on November 2, 1971, with the national merger of the two fraternities.)
George D. Gaw	1947	Roosevelt University	Chicago, Illinois	Inactive	
Byron E. Ellis	1948	Baylor University	Waco, Texas	Inactive	
Home J. Buckley	1948	DePaul University	Chicago, Illinois	Active	
Fred Black	1948	Wayne State University	Detroit, Michigan	Inactive	
Don Francisco	1949	Michigan State University	East Lansing, Michigan	Active	(Note: Absorbed the Alpha Kappa chapter of Gamma Alpha Chi on November 2, 1971, with the national merger of the two fraternities.)
George E. Merrick	1949	University of Miami	Coral Gables, Florida	Active	(Note: Absorbed the Psi chapter of Gamma Alpha Chi on November 2, 1971, with the national merger of the two fraternities.)
Lowell Thomas	1949	University of Colorado Boulder	Boulder, Colorado	Inactive	(Note: Absorbed the Phi chapter of Gamma Alpha Chi on November 2, 1971, with the national merger of the two fraternities.)
Herbert Hall Palmer	1949	University of Rhode Island	Kingston, Rhode Island	Inactive	
Douglas Leigh	1949	University of Florida	Gainesville, Florida	Inactive	(Note: Absorbed the Alpha Gamma chapter of Gamma Alpha Chi on November 2, 1971, with the national merger of the two fraternities.)
Kenneth Dameron	1949	Ohio State University	Columbus, Ohio	Inactive	(Note: Absorbed the Chi chapter of Gamma Alpha Chi on November 2, 1971, with the national merger of the two fraternities.)
Elwin G. Wood	1950	University of Arizona	Tucson, Arizona	Inactive	(Note: Absorbed the Alpha Mu chapter of Gamma Alpha Chi on November 2, 1971, with the national merger of the two fraternities.)
Merlin H. Aylesworth	1950	University of Denver	Denver, Colorado	Inactive	
Will C. Grant	1950	Southern Methodist University	Dallas, Texas	Active	(Note: Absorbed the Omega chapter of Gamma Alpha Chi on November 2, 1971, with the national merger of the two fraternities.)
A. B. Penny	1951	University of Houston	Houston, Texas	Active	(Note: Absorbed the Alpha Beta chapter of Gamma Alpha Chi on November 2, 1971, with the national merger of the two fraternities.)
George McLean	1952	University of Mississippi	University, Mississippi	Inactive	
Raymond Rubicam	1953	Arizona State University	Tempe, Arizona	Inactive	(Note: Absorbed the Alpha Iota chapter of Gamma Alpha Chi on November 2, 1971, with the national merger of the two fraternities.)
C. Brooks Smeeton	1953	Marquette University	Milwaukee, Wisconsin	Inactive	(Note: Absorbed the Alpha Theta chapter of Gamma Alpha Chi on November 2, 1971, with the national merger of the two fraternities.)
Elon Borton	1953	Florida State University	Tallahassee, Florida	Inactive	(Note: Absorbed the Alpha Delta chapter of Gamma Alpha Chi on November 2, 1971, with the national merger of the two fraternities.)
Ben Duffy	1954	Fordham University	New York City, New York	Inactive	(Note: Absorbed the Alpha Epsilon chapter of Gamma Alpha Chi on November 2, 1971, with the national merger of the two fraternities.)
Samuel C. Dobbs	1954	University of Georgia	Athens, Georgia	Inactive	(Note: Absorbed the Alpha Zeta chapter of Gamma Alpha Chi on November 2, 1971, with the national merger of the two fraternities.)
William Bernbach	1956	Long Island University	Brooklyn, New York	Inactive	
Eldridge Peterson	1957	Manhattan University	Bronx, New York City, New York	Inactive	
Arthur J. Madsen	1958	Whitworth University	Spokane, Washington	Inactive	
Clyde B. Sullivan	1958	Wichita State University	Wichita, Kansas	Inactive	
J. Culver Hill	1958	Texas Tech University	Lubbock, Texas	Inactive	(Note: Absorbed the Alpha Lambda chapter of Gamma Alpha Chi on November 2, 1971, with the national merger of the two fraternities.)
Thomas L. Yates	1958	Texas Christian University	Fort Worth, Texas	Inactive	
Charles H. Sandage	1959	Southern Illinois University Carbondale	Carbondale, Illinois	Active	
Nelson Carter	1959	California State University, Long Beach	Long Beach, California	Inactive	(Note: Absorbed the Alpha Omicron chapter of Gamma Alpha Chi on November 2, 1971, with the national merger of the two fraternities.)
Wesley Calvert	1959	Texas A&M University	College Station, Texas	Active	
	November 2, 1971	University of Oklahoma	Norman, Oklahoma	Inactive	(Note: Formed from the Mu chapter of Gamma Alpha Chi, with the national merger of the two fraternities.)
	November 2, 1971	University of Maryland, College Park	College Park, Maryland	Inactive	(Note: Formed from the Alpha Xi chapter of Gamma Alpha Chi, with the national merger of the two fraternities.)
	November 2, 1971	California State University, Chico	Chico, California	Inactive	(Note: Formed from the Alpha Rho chapter of Gamma Alpha Chi, with the national merger of the two fraternities.)
		Abilene Christian University	Abilene, Texas	Inactive	
		Augustana College	Rock Island, Illinois	Active	
		Ball State University	Muncie, Indiana	Active	
		Baruch College	New York City, New York	Inactive	
		Blackburn College	Carlinville, Illinois	Active	
		Bob Jones University	Greenville, South Carolina	Active	
		Brigham Young University	Provo, Utah	Active	
		Brigham Young University–Idaho	Rexburg, Idaho	Inactive	
		California State University, Fresno	Fresno, California	Active	
		Chaminade University of Honolulu	Honolulu, Hawaii	Active	
		Chapman University	Orange, California	Active	
		Clemson University	Clemson, South Carolina	Inactive	
		College for Creative Studies	Detroit, Michigan	Active	
		Colorado State University	Fort Collins, Colorado	Active	
		Columbia College Chicago	Chicago, Illinois	Active	
		Creighton University	Omaha, Nebraska	Active	
		Drury University	Springfield, Missouri	Inactive	
		East Tennessee State University	Johnson City, Tennessee	Inactive	
		Eastern Michigan University	Ypsilanti, Michigan	Inactive	
		Emory and Henry College	Emory, Virginia	Inactive	
		George Washington University	Washington, D.C.	Active	
		Grand Valley State University	Allendale, Michigan	Active	
		Hofstra University	Hempstead, New York	Inactive	
		Ithaca College	Ithaca, New York	Active	
		James Madison University	Harrisonburg, Virginia	Inactive	
		Johnson & Wales University	Providence, Rhode Island	Active	
		Kansas State University	Manhattan, Kansas	Active	
		Lee University	Cleveland, Tennessee	Active	
		Liberty University	Lynchburg, Virginia	Active	
		Lindenwood University	St. Charles, Missouri	Active	
		Louisiana State University	Baton Rouge, Louisiana	Inactive	
		Louisiana State University Shreveport	Shreveport, Louisiana	Active	
		Loyola University Maryland	Baltimore, Maryland	Active	
		Loyola University New Orleans	New Orleans, Louisiana	Active	
		Lynn University	Boca Raton, Florida	Active	
		Manhattan University	Bronx, New York City, New York	Active	
		Marian University	Indianapolis, Indiana	Active	
		Marietta College	Marietta, Ohio	Active	
		Marist University	Poughkeepsie, New York	Active	
		Marshall University	Huntington, West Virginia	Active	
		Marywood University	Scranton, Pennsylvania	Active	
		Miami International University of Art & Design	Miami, Florida	Inactive	(Note: The university closed in September 2013.)
		Midwestern State University	Wichita Falls, Texas	Active	
		Molloy University	Rockville Centre, New York	Active	
		Morehouse College	Atlanta, Georgia	Active	
		Morningside University	Sioux City, Iowa	Active	
		Murray State University	Murray, Kentucky	Active	
		Northwood University	Midland, Michigan	Active	
		Oklahoma State University	Stillwater, Oklahoma	Active	
		Olivet Nazarene University	Bourbonnais, Illinois	Active	
		Oral Roberts University	Tulsa, Oklahoma	Active	
		Pace University	New York City, New York	Active	
		Point Park University	Pittsburgh, Pennsylvania	Active	
		Purdue University	West Lafayette, Indiana	Active	
		Purdue University Northwest	Hammond, Indiana	Active	(Note: Chapter formed at Purdue University Calumet, now Purdue University Northwest.)
		Ringling College of Art and Design	Sarasota, Florida	Active	
		Roger Williams University	Bristol, Rhode Island	Active	
		Rogers State University	Claremore, Oklahoma	Active	
		Rowan University	Glassboro, New Jersey	Active	
		Saint Louis University	St. Louis, Missouri	Active	
		Samford University	Homewood, Alabama	Active	
		Simmons University	Boston, Massachusetts	Active	
		South Dakota State University	Brookings, South Dakota	Active	
		Spring Hill College	Mobile, Alabama	Active	
		St. Bonaventure University	St. Bonaventure, New York	Active	
		St. John's University	New York City, New York	Active	
		State University of New York at Oneonta	Oneonta, New York	Active	
		Suffolk University	Boston, Massachusetts	Active	
		Texas State University	San Marcos, Texas	Active	
		Union University	Jackson, Tennessee	Active	
		University of Central Oklahoma	Edmond, Oklahoma	Active	
		University of Hartford	West Hartford, Connecticut	Active	
		University of Louisiana at Lafayette	Lafayette, Louisiana	Active	
		University of Memphis	Memphis, Tennessee	Active	
		University of Missouri–St. Louis	St. Louis, Missouri	Active	
		University of Nebraska Omaha	Omaha, Nebraska	Active	
		University of Nevada, Reno	Reno, Nevada	Active	
		University of North Carolina at Chapel Hill	Chapel Hill, North Carolina	Active	
		University of North Texas	Denton, Texas	Active	
		University of Northern Iowa	Cedar Falls, Iowa	Active	
		University of San Francisco	San Francisco, California	Active	
		University of Scranton	Scranton, Pennsylvania	Active	
		University of South Alabama	Mobile, Alabama	Active	
		University of South Carolina	Columbia, South Carolina	Active	
		University of Southern Indiana	Evansville, Indiana	Active	
		University of Southern Mississippi	Hattiesburg, Mississippi	Active	
		University of Tennessee	Knoxville, Tennessee	Active	
		University of Texas Rio Grande Valley	Edinburg, Texas	Active	
		University of Texas at San Antonio	San Antonio, Texas	Active	
		University of Tulsa	Tulsa, Oklahoma	Active	
		University of West Florida	Pensacola, Florida	Active	
		West Virginia University	Morgantown, West Virginia	Active	
		Western Michigan University	Kalamazoo, Michigan	Active	
		Winona State University	Winona, Minnesota	Active	
