= Daniel L. Anderson =

American politician

Member of the Pennsylvania House of Representatives from the 31st district
- In office January 1, 1991 – November 30, 1992
- Preceded by: Brian D. Clark
- Succeeded by: David J. Steil

Personal details
- Born: September 20, 1968 (age 57) Pittsburgh, Pennsylvania, United States
- Party: Republican
- Education: Penn State University; Robert Morris College
- Occupation: Real estate broker

Daniel L. Anderson (born September 20, 1968) is a former Republican member of the Pennsylvania House of Representatives.

Anderson graduated from Hampton High School and attended Penn State University for two years and Robert Morris College for one. He then obtained his real-estate broker's license and worked for Howard Hanna Real Estate Services and managed property for Ray Anderson and Sons.

He was first elected to represent the 31st legislative district in the Pennsylvania House of Representatives in 1990. After the 1992 legislative redistricting, that district was merged with the 30th legislative district, which was represented by long-time incumbent Republican Rick Cessar. After Cessar defeated Anderson in the Republican primary, Anderson sought to run in the general election as an independent, but was blocked by the Bureau of Commissions, Elections and Legislation, based on a state law preventing independent candidacies by individuals who held another party's registration at the time of the primary.

In 1994, he again ran for the 30th legislative district in the Pennsylvania House of Representatives following the retirement of incumbent Rick Cessar. He lost the Republican primary to 28-year-old Jeff Habay. In 2000, Anderson and a former Habay staffer initiated campaign audit proceedings that would eventually lead to a Habay being convicted in 2005 on ethics law violations. In May 2004, during that trial Habay filed a false police report claiming that Anderson had mailed him anthrax.

He is the Township Manager for Indiana Township, Allegheny County, Pennsylvania
