= Arvind Venkat =

American physician and politician

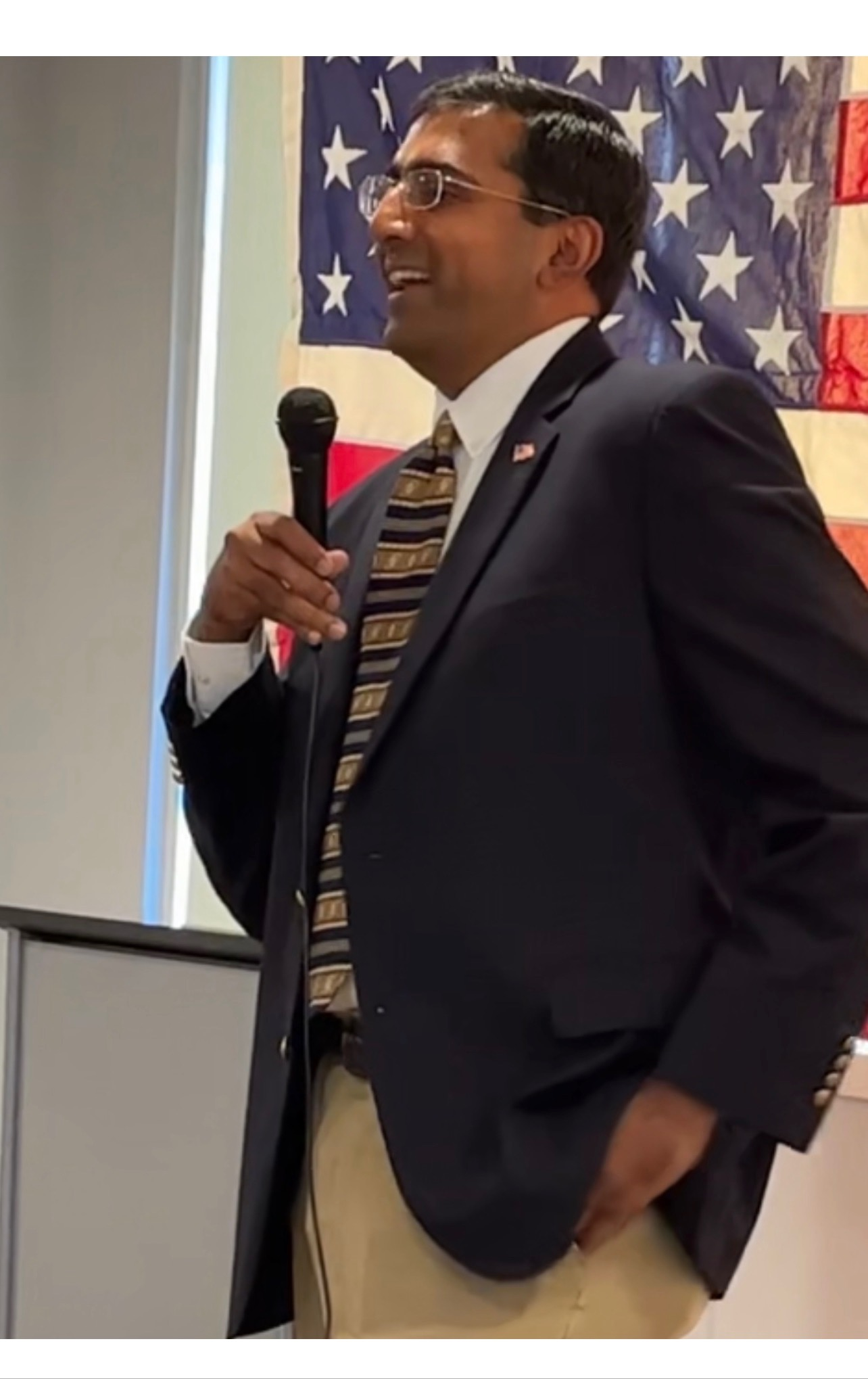

Member of the Pennsylvania House of Representatives from the 30th district
- Incumbent
- Assumed office January 3, 2023
- Preceded by: Lori Mizgorski (redistricting)

Personal details
- Born: June 6, 1974 (age 52) Madurai, Tamil Nadu, India
- Citizenship: United States
- Party: Democratic
- Education: Harvard University (AB, AM); Yale School of Medicine (MD)

Arvind Venkat (born June 6, 1974) is an American physician and politician. A member of the Democratic Party, he represents the 30th district in the Pennsylvania House of Representatives, which comprises the North Hills suburbs of Pittsburgh in Allegheny County. Before entering politics, Venkat was an attending physician at Allegheny General Hospital, specializing in emergency medicine.

== Early life and education ==
Venkat was born in Madurai, India to a Tamil family, but was raised in Detroit, Michigan after his family immigrated. He attended Detroit Country Day School for high school, graduating in 1992. Venkat graduated from Harvard University in 1996 with a Bachelor of Arts degree in History and Science and a Master of Arts degree in History of Science. He then attended Yale School of Medicine where he graduated with a medical degree in 2000.

== Medical career ==
Venkat completed his residency in emergency medicine at the University of Cincinnati Academic Health Center in 2004.

Venkat is an emergency physician affiliated with Allegheny Health Network, which includes Allegheny General Hospital as its flagship hospital. He also is a professor of emergency medicine at Drexel University College of Medicine. From 2019 to 2020, Venkat served as president of the Pennsylvania chapter of the American College of Emergency Physicians (ACEP), and in 2020, he was elected to the board of ACEP.

== Pennsylvania House of Representatives ==
=== Elections ===
==== 2022 ====
On February 24, 2022, Venkat announced his campaign for the Pennsylvania House of Representatives in the 30th district, which contains Ben Avon, Ben Avon Heights, Emsworth, Franklin Park, Kilbuck Township, McCandless, and Ohio Township, as well as parts of Hampton Township. The 30th district was an open seat in 2022, since Republican incumbent Rep. Lori Mizgorski, who due to redistricting no longer resided in the district, opted instead to run for the state senate against incumbent Lindsey Williams. Election analysts predicted that the general election would be competitive and presented a pickup opportunity for the Democratic Party.

In his announcement, Venkat said that he was motivated to run to address issues that often intersected with his work as an emergency physician, especially those that were exacerbated by the COVID-19 pandemic; he identified strengthening emergency medical services and other first responder services, expanding access to affordable healthcare, and upgrading infrastructure as some of his priorities. Venkat also voiced his support for voting rights protections, gun control, and efforts to combat climate change.

In the aftermath of the U.S. Supreme Court decision Dobbs v. Jackson Women's Health Organization, which overturned Roe v. Wade, Venkat spoke in favor of keeping abortion legal in Pennsylvania.

Venkat was unopposed in the Democratic primary. He faced Republican former Allegheny County Councilmember Cindy Kirk in the general election, prevailing by a margin of over 10 percentage points.

==== 2024 ====
Venkat was re-elected in the 2024 General Election, again prevailing by a margin of over 10 percentage points.

2026

Venkat was re-elected in the 2026 General Election, prevailing by a margin of over 26 percentage points.

=== Committee assignments ===
Venkat is a member of the following committees of the Pennsylvania House of Representatives:

- Energy
- Finance
- Health
- Human Services
- Insurance
- Professional Licensure

=== Tenure ===
Upon taking office, Venkat became the first state representative of Indian-American descent in state history, as well as the first licensed physician in the General Assembly in 60 years.

In 2025, Venkat co-sponsored a bill that would mandate health insurers cover vaccines approved by the Pennsylvania Department of Health. The move came after the CDC began reversing vaccine recommendations at the behest of U.S. Health Secretary Robert F. Kennedy Jr..

== Personal life ==
Venkat resides in McCandless, Pennsylvania with his wife Veena and their three children.

== Electoral history ==
Pennsylvania House of Representatives, 30th district, 2022
Party	Candidate	Votes	%
Democratic primary election
Democratic	Arvind Venkat	Unopposed	
Total votes		7,959	100.00%
General election
Democratic	Arvind Venkat	18,757	55.34%
Republican	Cindy Kirk	15,136	44.66%
Total votes		33,893	100.00%
Democratic gain from Republican			

Pennsylvania House of Representatives
Preceded by Lori Mizgorski (redistricting)	Member of the Pennsylvania House of Representatives from the 30th district since January 3, 2023	Incumbent
