= Randy Vulakovich =

American politician (born 1950)

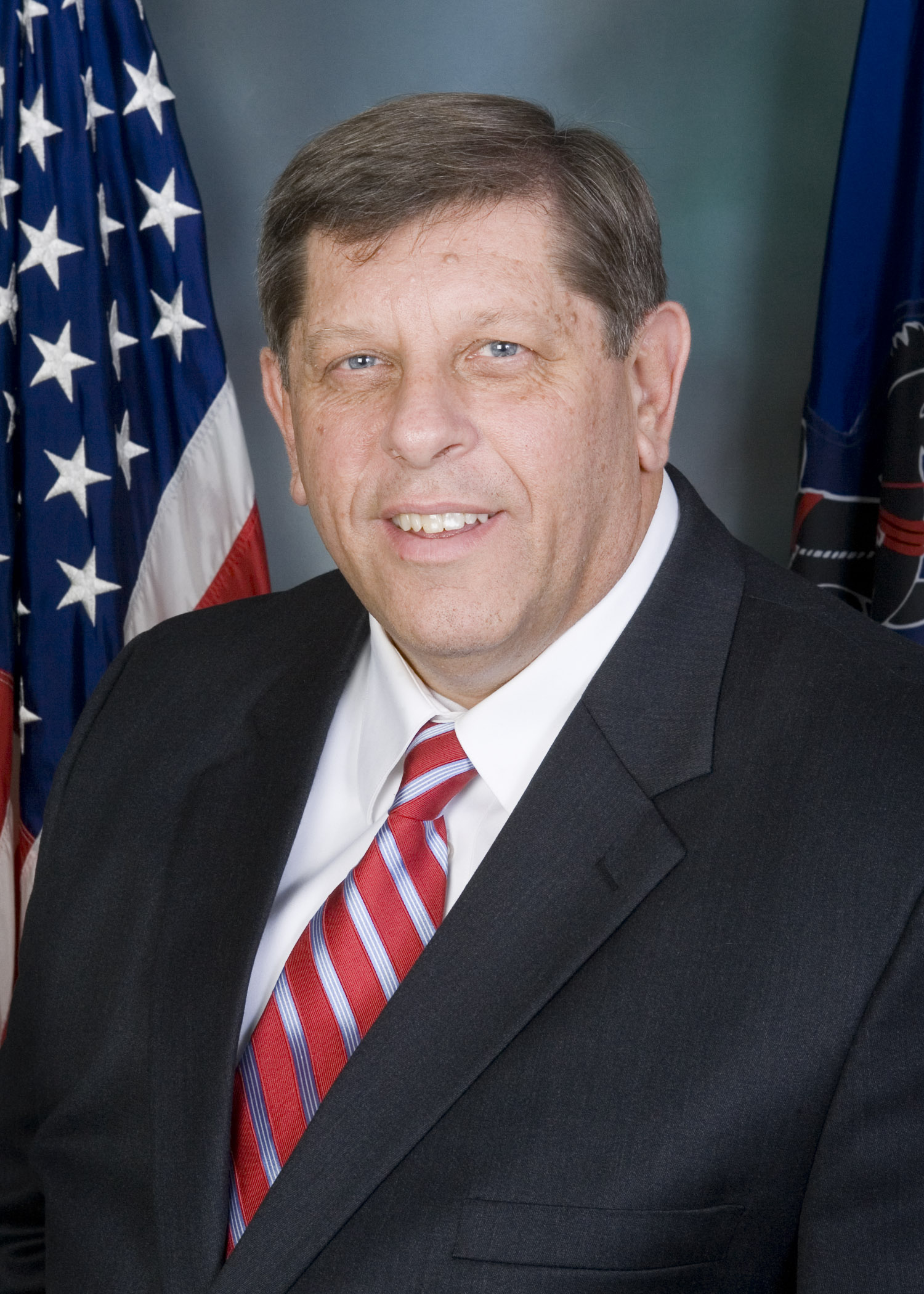

Member of the Pennsylvania Senate from the 38th district
- In office January 6, 2015 – January 1, 2019
- Preceded by: Jim Ferlo
- Succeeded by: Lindsey Williams

Member of the Pennsylvania Senate from the 40th district
- In office August 29, 2012 – January 5, 2015
- Preceded by: Jane Orie
- Succeeded by: Mario Scavello

Member of the Pennsylvania House of Representatives from the 30th district
- In office January 2, 2007 – August 29, 2012
- Preceded by: Shawn Flaherty
- Succeeded by: Hal English

Personal details
- Born: 1950 (age 75–76) Pittsburgh, Pennsylvania, U.S.
- Party: Republican
- Spouse: Bobbie
- Children: 2
- Education: Duquesne University

Randy Vulakovich (born 1950) is an American politician who served as a member of the Pennsylvania State Senate for the 38th district from January 6, 2015, to January 1, 2019. He previously served in the 40th legislative district. He was elected in a special election on August 7, 2012.

== Education ==
Prior to holding elected office, Vulakovich attended the Allegheny County Police Academy and Duquesne University.

== Career ==
He served as a police sergeant with the Shaler Township Police Department, where he was known as "Officer V."

=== State House ===
On April 11, 2006, Democrat Shawn Flaherty defeated Republican Mike Dolan in a special election to fill the remainder of Jeff Habay's term as state representative. On May 16, 2006, Vulakovich defeated two other Republicans (including Mike Dolan) for the right to challenge Flaherty in that November's election. Vulakovich defeated Flaherty that November by a 53–47 margin.

=== State Senate ===
In 2012 he defeated former Congresswoman Melissa Hart in the Republican primary to fill the vacancy in Pennsylvania's 40th State Senate district created by the resignation of Jane Orie. Vulakovich then faced Democratic nominee Sharon Brown and was elected to the seat in the August 7, 2012, special election with over 73% of the vote to Brown's 27%.

Vulokovich was reelected to a full term in 2014 in the newly established 38th district. In May 2018, he lost re-nomination to that seat in the Republican primary to Ross commissioner Jeremy Shaffer.

For most of his tenure, Vulakovich represented Pittsburgh's 11th and 12th wards; he was the only elected Republican representing any portion of Pittsburgh above the county level.
