= Helen Gillette =

American politician

Helen D. Gillette

Member of the Pennsylvania House of Representatives from the 31st district
- In office 1969–1978
- Preceded by: District
- Succeeded by: Brian D. Clark

Member of the Pennsylvania House of Representatives from the Allegheny County district
- In office 1967–1968

Personal details
- Born: Helen D. Frederick; March 23, 1919 Pittsburgh, Pennsylvania, U.S.
- Died: November 23, 1991 (aged 72) Natrona Heights, Pennsylvania, U.S.
- Party: Democratic
- Children: 2
- Occupation: Insurance agent and politician

Helen D. Gillette (March 23, 1919 – November 23, 1991) was a small business executive who became a Democratic member of the Pennsylvania House of Representatives. She represented Pennsylvania's 31st district for six terms from 1969 to 1978.

== Formative years ==
Born in Pittsburgh, Pennsylvania on March 23, 1919, as Helen D. Frederick, Helen D. Gillette was a graduate of New Kensington High School and later took night courses through the University of Pittsburgh and the Pennsylvania State University Extension.

In 1947, Gillette opened her own insurance and accounting business, which she continued to operate following the end of her legislative career.

== Public service career ==
In 1964, Gillette served as a justice of the peace in Allegheny County, Pennsylvania.

In 1966, Gillette ran for a seat in the Pennsylvania House of Representatives. While campaigning to represent her Allegheny County district, she pledged to vote against the state's planned acquisition of land to build the proposed Lake Erie-Ohio River Canal. Gillette won her primary race by defeating her opponent, Harry McCallister of Curtisville, without accepting any campaign contributions and by spending just $682. She then won the general election in November by defeating her Republican opponent, Indiana Township real estate broker John H. Smith, by a margin of 11,391 to 7,729, and went on to represent constituents in the Allegheny County district from 1967 to 1968 (in what then became the newly created 31st district).

An environmental protection advocate, she was a vocal supporter of Pennsylvania's Clean Streams Act, which was passed in 1937. She advocated strongly for stiffer penalties for polluters, stating that Pennsylvania needed to "do much more in the field of research, learning more about pollutants and how to control them, and learning better methods of purifying water for reuse." In 1967, she co-sponsored legislation to required couples wanting to dissolve their marriages to live separately for one year prior to filing for divorce.

Gillette subsequently campaigned for, and won re-election to, the Pennsylvania House, and then represented the established 31st district from 1969 to 1978. While serving on the Pennsylvania House Conservation Committee in 1969, she traveled with her fellow committee members to Minersville, Pennsylvania in early March to investigate strip mine landfill dumps in the state's anthracite coal region, as part of the committee's information gathering as it considered two proposed waste disposal bills (House Bill 153, a solid waste materials act that would regulate the transportation of solid waste across county lines and prohibit dumping in mines if it would create environmental or health hazards, and House Bill 279, which would amend the Clean Streams Act to toughen penalties for polluters). In addition to visiting the Minersville landfill, members of the committee inspected the Nanticoke landfill in Newport Township, Luzerne County, the drainage tunnel and its mouth in North Union Township, Schuylkill County, and the East Norwegian Township and Tamaqua area landfills in Schuylkill County. Although several committee members reported to newspapers and their constituents that the landfills they inspected appeared to be in good shape, Gillette, who was the only female member of the committee, stated that it was too early to tell what impact the landfill operations might have on the residents of the communities where they were located. "The problem needs a lot of study, and I wouldn't want to say what the effect of garbage burial would be on land and water resources." She added that a more thorough investigation of individual landfill sites should be undertaken statewide before any conclusions were made by the committee. She also participated in the committee's public hearing regarding the proposed legislation, which was held in Hazleton on March 7, and well attended.

In 1970, she supported the repeal of a controversial insurance premium tax. In 1971, she participated in a pro-life rally at the University of Pittsburgh, and delivered a presentation entitled, "The Pennsylvania Legislature and Abortion Legislation." In 1972, she helped to form the Legislators for Muskie Committee in support of Edmund Muskie's ultimately unsuccessful campaign to become president of the United States. In 1974, she served on the Pennsylvania House's Joint Conservation Committee, and participated in a tour of, and subsequent meeting about, the Blacklegs watershed in Indiana County on May 24 to explore ways to eliminate the watershed's problem with mine acid pollution.

In 1975, Gillette was appointed to the Pennsylvania House's Conservation and Consumer Protection committees. The chief sponsor of Pennsylvania's 1976 "Lifeline Bill" to force utility operators statewide to set lower "lifeline" rates for low-volume utility users, deliver financial relief from high utility bills to low-income residents statewide, and encourage greater energy conservation by all utility consumers, shepherded the legislation to a 102–56 victory in the House.

In 1977, she served on the Pennsylvania House's Appropriations Committee. That same year, she watched the progress that she had made in securing her colleagues' 1976 passage of the "Lifeline" energy bill dissolve when the Pennsylvania House voted 106–90 to defeat her newest version of the legislation, which would have defined lifeline rates for lower-income consumers and authorized utility companies to set peak demand or time of day pricing to encourage their customers to conserve energy.

=== Controversies ===
During her six-term tenure, she became known for her disagreements with Governor Milton Shapp and her fellow members of the Pennsylvania Democratic Party regarding its platforms at the time regarding the death penalty and the 1973 Abortion Control Act. In 1974, she voted with 156 of her fellow legislators, to override Shapp's veto of legislation that would restrict women's access to abortion. The law, according to its supporters, was designed to reduce abortions that were deemed "not necessary to save a woman's life or health" while forcing women seeking abortions for any other reason to obtain "written permission from [their] spouse or, if ... under 18, the permission of a parent."

After leaving her legislative position in 1978, she pursued an unsuccessful campaign to secure the Democratic nomination for the office of lieutenant governor, losing to Robert P. Casey, a teacher and ice cream parlor owner from Monroeville whom voters apparently mistook for the well-known state politician Bob Casey Sr.

== Later years ==
Following her legislative career, Gillette resumed work with her insurance business, but continued to remain active in politics, joining with her former colleagues just a few months before her death to urge the current state legislature to take up action on campaign finance reform and reduce the impact of special interest groups on the state's budget development process.

== Death, funeral and interment ==
Gillette died from cancer at the age of seventy-two on Saturday, November 23, 1991, at her home in Natrona Heights, Pennsylvania. A Mass of Christian Burial service was held for her at 9:30 a.m. at the Most Blessed Sacrament Roman Catholic Church on Monday, November 25 in Natrona Heights, followed by interment services at the Our Lady of Hope Cemetery in Frazier Township.
