= Jeff Habay =

American politician

Jeffrey Earl Habay
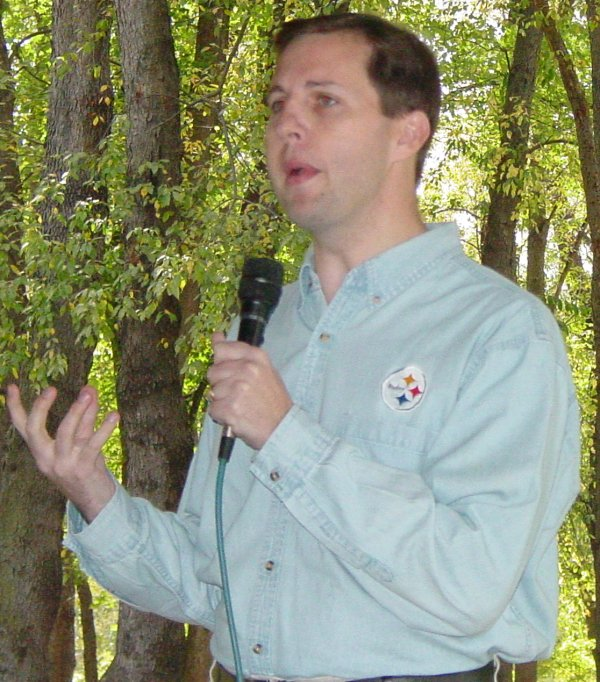
- Habay speaking at a GOP picnic in Allegheny County, Pennsylvania

Member of the Pennsylvania House of Representatives from the 30th district
- In office January 3, 1995 – February 7, 2006
- Preceded by: Rick Cessar
- Succeeded by: Shawn Flaherty

Personal details
- Born: Jeffrey Earl Habay; May 9, 1966 (age 60) Pittsburgh, Pennsylvania
- Party: Republican
- Education: American University

Jeffrey Earl Habay (born May 9, 1966) (commonly known as Jeff Habay) is a former Republican member of the Pennsylvania House of Representatives, who was elected to represent the 30th legislative district in the Pennsylvania House of Representatives in 1994 at the age of 28. A native of O'Hara Township, Pennsylvania, he was considered a rising star in the Republican party, eventually being named by his caucus to the position of Majority Deputy Whip. In 2006 he resigned his position after being found guilty of violations of the state Ethics Code, alleging false anthrax attacks and using state staffers for personal use.

== Early life and education ==
Jeff Habay was born in Pittsburgh, Pennsylvania. His father, Harry Habay, owned and operated Habay Heating Co., an O'Hara Township, Allegheny County, Pennsylvania-based heating and air conditioning business for over 60 years. Three of his brothers worked in the family business, which is currently operated by Jim Habay, who has also served as Township Supervisor in O'Hara Township, Allegheny County, Pennsylvania.

Habay attended Fox Chapel Area High School, located in the northern suburbs of Pittsburgh, where he played saxophone in the school band and developed an early interest in politics. After graduating from high school in 1984, he attended The American University in Washington, DC. He was active in the campus student government organization, where he served as vice president and Interim President. He was one of founders of American University's Delta Tau Delta chapter. He studied criminal justice and political science and graduated with a degree from the College of Public and International Affairs in 1988.

Following graduation, he worked as a staff assistant for Congressman Ken Kramer, a Colorado Republican, and as a legislative aide for Congressman William F. Clinger, a Pennsylvania Republican. He then returned to western Pennsylvania to help his father manage the family business. He also worked as a career and admissions counselor for the Pittsburgh Technical Institute, where he counseled students and presented financial-aid seminars for parents and prospective students.

== Political career ==
He also served as Membership chairman of the Allegheny County Young Republicans. Habay then went on to become Vice Chairman of the Allegheny County Republican Party for four years, and was elected to become the State Committee At-Large Member for all of Allegheny County and top vote-getter for Presidential Delegate for the National Convention in 2004 for the 4th Pennsylvania U.S. Congressional District.

In 1992, Habay was appointed Treasurer of O'Hara, Pennsylvania, a part-time position placing him in charge of an annual budget of $7.1 million. During his tenure, the township cut its taxes by 13%, a move for which Habay took partial credit, citing his "careful audit" of the budget.

== House of Representatives ==
=== 1994 election ===
==== Primary ====
In 1994, Habay ran for the 30th legislative district in the Pennsylvania House of Representatives, a seat in Pittsburgh's northern suburbs that had been held by Republican Rick Cessar for 24 years. His opponent in the Republican primary was Daniel L. Anderson, who had represented the neighboring 31st legislative district from 1990 until it was moved to Bucks County during the 1992 legislative redistricting. Observers noted strong similarities between the candidates, as both were under 30 years old and ran on platforms of reducing taxes, privatizing the Pennsylvania liquor store system, and legislative term limits. In the end, Habay, who was endorsed by the Fox Chapel and O'Hara Republican committees, defeated Anderson by a margin of 3980 to 2825.

==== General Election ====
In the general election Habay faced Democrat Mark F. Hannan, a union carpenter and Shaler Township, Pennsylvania commissioner. The candidates clashed on issues of the recent 1% sales tax increase in Allegheny County and on the expansion of riverboat gambling. Hannan declined campaign assistance from the Harrisburg-based House Democratic Campaign Committee because "[t]hey want you to jump through their hoops, and then when you get to Harrisburg, you owe them." Habay's candidacy was assisted by Pennsylvania Governor Tom Ridge and the campaign spent $900 a week to show a 30-second advertisement on major cable networks, a large expenditure for a State House election at that time. Habay won the endorsement of the Pittsburgh Post-Gazette. In spite of a Democratic registration edge, Habay won by a margin of 13,146 to 11,079, thereby helping his party secure a 1-seat majority in House for the first time in 12 years.

=== 1996 election ===
In 1996, Habay again faced Daniel L. Anderson for the Republican nomination in the 30th legislative district.

Habay won the nomination in a landslide winning all 61 district polling locations and faced Democrat Tom Sunday, a former Shaler Township Commissioner and sporting goods store owner, in the general election. During the campaign, Sunday said that Habay's opposition to a proposed gasoline tax had resulted in delays in a construction project to straighten the Mae West Bend on Pennsylvania Route 8. Habay won the general election, defeating Sunday by a margin of 19,658 to 9,009. again winning all 61 district polling locations.

In 1998, Anderson again challenged Habay for the Republican nomination for the 30th legislative district in a race. Habay again won the primary. This time defeating Anderson with 81.2% of the vote and with token opposition from Tom Sunday in the general election. Habay defeated Sunday by a 75% to 25% margin.

=== Legislative activity and 2000 and 2004 ===
During his tenure, Habay became known for his "exuberance and willingness to work with both parties" as well as "natural skill" as a campaigner. He was named Deputy Whip in the Republican caucus. However his career is rapidly falling after a succession of accusations including a charge that the lawmaker falsely claimed a political foe had mailed him a suspicious white powder.

=== Arrest, Conviction and Sentencing ===
In 2004, Habay was accused of filing a false police report concerning an alleged anthrax attack, of theft for using state-paid staffers to research whistle blowers, and violations of the State Ethics Act. He pled no contest to 21 counts and was sentenced to four to eight months in jail plus fourteen months of house arrest followed by two years probation. On February 7, 2006 Habay resigned from the Pennsylvania House of Representatives.
