= Pennsylvania's 38th Senate district =

American legislative district

Pennsylvania's 38th State Senate district
Senator
Lindsey Williams; D–West View
- Population (2021): 251,647

Pennsylvania State Senate District 38 includes part of Allegheny County. It is currently represented by Democrat Lindsey Williams.

== District profile ==
The district includes the following areas:

- Aspinwall
- Blawnox
- Brackenridge
- Cheswick
- East Deer Township
- Etna
- Fawn Township
- Fox Chapel
- Frazer Township
- Hampton Township
- Harmar Township
- Harrison Township
- Indiana Township
- McCandless Township
- O'Hara Township
- Pine Township
- Pittsburgh [PART, Wards 10, 11 and 12]
- Richland Township
- Ross Township
- Shaler Township
- Sharpsburg
- Springdale
- Springdale Township
- Tarentum
- West Deer Township
- West View

== Senators ==
Representative	Party	Years	District home	Note	Counties
Stanley M. Noszka	Democratic	1967–1978			Allegheny (part)
Leonard J. Bodack	Democratic	1979–2002			Allegheny (part)
Jim Ferlo	Democratic	2003–2012		Redistricted	Allegheny (part), Armstrong (part), Westmoreland (part)
Jim Ferlo	Democratic	2013–2014		Redistricted	Allegheny (part)
Randy Vulakovich	Republican	2015 – 2019	Shaler Township	Redistricted from the 40th	Allegheny (part)
Lindsey Williams	Democratic	2019 – present		West View	Allegheny (part)

== Recent election results ==
PA Senate election, 2022
Party	Candidate	Votes	%
Democratic	Lindsey Williams (incumbent)	69,839	55.6
Republican	Lori Mizgorski	55,808	44.4
Total votes		125,647	100.0
Democratic hold			

PA Senate election, 2018
Party	Candidate	Votes	%
Democratic	Lindsey Williams	62,361	50.3
Republican	Jeremy Shaffer	61,568	49.7
Total votes		123,929	100.0
Democratic gain from Republican			

PA Senate election, 2014
Party	Candidate	Votes	%
Republican	Randy Vulakovich	58,599	100
Total votes		58,599	100.0
Republican gain from Democratic			

PA Senate election, 2010
Party	Candidate	Votes	%
Democratic	Jim Ferlo (incumbent)	53,595	100
Total votes		92,821	100.0
Democratic hold			
