= Gamma Alpha Chi =

American women's advertising fraternity (1920–1973)

- ΓΑΧ
- Founded: February 9, 1920; 106 years ago University of Missouri
- Type: Professional
- Affiliation: Independent
- Status: Merged
- Merge date: November 2, 1971
- Successor: Alpha Delta Sigma
- Emphasis: Advertising, women's
- Scope: National
- Motto: "Truth and Service"
- Colors: Gold and Brown
- Symbol: Golden pen, star
- Flower: Ophelia rose
- Publication: Gac-O-Grams
- Chapters: 52
- Members: 8,500+ lifetime
- Headquarters: United States

Gamma Alpha Chi (ΓΑΧ) was an American professional advertising fraternity for women. It was founded at the University of Missouri in Columbia, Missouri in 1920 and merged into Alpha Delta Sigma in 1971.

== History ==
Gamma Alpha Chi was formed at the University of Missouri on February 9, 1920. It was a professional women's fraternity for advertising. It was founded under the leadership of Ruth Prior Midyette, with the guidance of Walter Williams who was the dean of the Department of Journalism. Its founding members were:

- Elizabeth Atteberry
- Frances Chapman
- Lulu Crum
- Betty Etter
- Christine Gabriel
- Lucille Gross
- Alfreda Halligan
- Christine Hood
- Mary McKee
- May Miller
- Ruth Prather
- Rowena Reed
- Allene Richardson
- Mildred Roetzel
- Selma Stein
- Ruth Taylor
- Beatrice Watts
- Ella Wyatt

Mrs. Herbert Smith was the fraternity's founding patroness.

Gamma Alpha Chi added a second chapter at the University of Texas at Austin in February 1921. A third chapter was established at the University of Washington in 1923. By 1930, the fraternity had chartered seven chapters. Any female student who was preparing for a career in advertising was eligible for membership.

The first national convention was in May 1926, during Journalism Week. This convention formed the National constitution elected the first National Officers and selected GAC-O-GRAMS, the Alpha chapter publication as the national publication.

Gamma Alpha Chi was affiliated with the Advertising Federation of America and the Advertising Association of the West. Its national officers were president, vice president, secretary, and treasurer.

In May 1967, the women's fraternity had initiated 8,500 members at 52 chapters, 39 of which were active. On November 2, 1971, the fraternity merged with Alpha Delta Sigma, a professional advertising men's fraternity, also formed at the University of Missouri. The new advertising fraternity for men and women was called Alpha Delta Sigma. It merged with American Advertising Federation by 1973, becoming an honor society for advertising.

== Symbols ==
The badge of Gamma Alpha Chi was an octagon-shaped shield with a fountain pen at a diagonal behind the shield. Originally, the pen had been on the horizontal axis, but some time after 1928, it was changed to a diagonal. It was rendered in gold and had a black field. On the face of the badge were a star indicating truth in advertising and the image of the Western Hemisphere indicating universality of advertising behind the letters ΓΑΧ. The badge of pledging is simply the fraternity colors, gold and brown.

The colors of Gamma Alpha Chi were gold and brown. Its flower was the Ophelia or yellow rose. Its motto was "Truth and Service". The fraternity's publication was Gac-O-Grams.

== Chapters ==
Following is a list of Gamma Alpha Chi chapters.

Chapter	Charter date and range	Institution	Location	Status	Ref.
Alpha	February 9, 1920 – November 2, 1971	University of Missouri	Columbia, Missouri	Merged (ΑΔΣ)	
Beta	February 1921– 1955	University of Texas at Austin	Austin, Texas	Inactive	
Gamma	1923–1947; 1955 – November 2, 1971	University of Washington	Seattle, Washington	Merged (ΑΔΣ)	
Delta	1924–1940; 1945 – November 2, 1971	University of Illinois Urbana-Champaign	Urbana, Illinois	Merged (ΑΔΣ)	
Epsilon	March 1925–1941; 1949 – November 2, 1971	University of Nebraska–Lincoln	Lincoln, Nebraska	Merged (ΑΔΣ)	
Zeta	1927 – November 2, 1971	University of Oregon	Eugene, Oregon	Merged (ΑΔΣ)	
Eta	1928 – November 2, 1971	University of Southern California	Los Angeles, California	Merged (ΑΔΣ)	
Theta	1929–1945	Washington State University	Pullman, Washington	Inactive	
Iota	1929–1931	University of California, Berkeley	Berkeley, California	Inactive	
Kappa				Unassigned ?	
Lambda	1946 – November 2, 1971	University of Iowa	Iowa City, Iowa	Merged (ΑΔΣ)	
Mu	1947 – November 2, 1971	University of Oklahoma	Norman, Oklahoma	Merged (ΑΔΣ)	
Nu	1947 – November 2, 1971	University of Kansas	Lawrence, Kansas	Merged (ΑΔΣ)	
Xi	January 15, 1948 – 1955	Syracuse University	Syracuse, New York	Inactive	
Omicron	1948–1950	Roosevelt University	Chicago, Illinois	Inactive	
Pi	1948 – November 2, 1971	Indiana University Bloomington	Bloomington, Indiana	Merged (ΑΔΣ)	
Rho	February 4, 1948 – 1954	Butler University	Indianapolis, Indiana	Inactive	
Sigma	1948 – November 2, 1971	City College of New York	New York City, New York	Merged (ΑΔΣ)	
Tau	1948–1950	University of California, Los Angeles	Los Angeles, California	Inactive	
Upsilon	1949 – November 2, 1971	San Jose State University	San Jose, California	Merged (ΑΔΣ)	
Phi	1949 – November 2, 1971	University of Colorado Boulder	Boulder, Colorado	Merged (ΑΔΣ)	
Chi	1949 – November 2, 1971	Ohio State University	Columbus, Ohio	Merged (ΑΔΣ)	
Psi	1950 – November 2, 1971	University of Miami	Coral Gables, Florida	Merged (ΑΔΣ)	
Omega	1950 – November 2, 1971	Southern Methodist University	Dallas, Texas	Merged (ΑΔΣ)	
Alpha Alpha	1950 – November 2, 1971	University of Wisconsin–Madison	Madison, Wisconsin	Merged (ΑΔΣ)	
Alpha Beta	1950–1954; 1961 – November 2, 1971	University of Houston	Houston, Texas	Merged (ΑΔΣ)	
Alpha Gamma	1951 – November 2, 1971	University of Florida	Gainesville, Florida	Merged (ΑΔΣ)	
Alpha Delta	1951 – November 2, 1971	Florida State University	Tallahassee, Florida	Merged (ΑΔΣ)	
Alpha Epsilon	1953 – November 2, 1971	Fordham University	New York City, New York	Merged (ΑΔΣ)	
Alpha Zeta	1956 – November 2, 1971	University of Georgia	Athens, Georgia	Merged (ΑΔΣ)	
Alpha Eta	1956 – November 2, 1971	Temple University	Philadelphia, Pennsylvania	Merged (ΑΔΣ)	
Alpha Theta	1957 – November 2, 1971	Marquette University	Milwaukee, Wisconsin	Merged (ΑΔΣ)	
Alpha Iota	1958 – November 2, 1971	Arizona State University	Tempe, Arizona	Merged (ΑΔΣ)	
Alpha Kappa	1958 – November 2, 1971	Michigan State University	East Lansing, Michigan	Merged (ΑΔΣ)	
Alpha Lambda	1959 – November 2, 1971	Texas Tech University	Lubbock, Texas	Merged (ΑΔΣ)	
Alpha Mu	1960 – November 2, 1971	University of Arizona	Tucson, Arizona	Merged (ΑΔΣ)	
Alpha Nu	1960 – November 2, 1971	University of Texas at Austin	Austin, Texas	Merged (ΑΔΣ)	
Alpha Xi	1961 – November 2, 1971	University of Maryland, College Park	College Park, Maryland	Merged (ΑΔΣ)	
Alpha Omicron	1962 – November 2, 1971	California State University, Long Beach	Long Beach, California	Merged (ΑΔΣ)	
Alpha Pi	1964 – November 2, 1971	New York University	New York City, New York	Merged (ΑΔΣ)	
Alpha Rho	1966 – November 2, 1971	California State University, Chico	Chico, California	Merged (ΑΔΣ)	
