= Perry Warren =

American politician

Member of the Pennsylvania House of Representatives from the 31st district
- Incumbent
- Assumed office January 3, 2017
- Preceded by: Steve Santarsiero

Personal details
- Born: July 28, 1963 (age 63) Newtown, Pennsylvania, U.S.
- Party: Democratic
- Education: Colgate University (BA); University of North Carolina (JD)

Perry Warren (born July 28, 1963) is an American politician who has served in the Pennsylvania House of Representatives from the 31st district since 2017.

== Committee assignments ==
- Commerce
- Insurance
- Local Government
- Transportation
- Chair, House Insurance Committee
