= Leonard Bodack =

American politician

Leonard J. Bodack

Member of the Pennsylvania Senate from the 38th district
- In office January 2, 1979 – November 30, 2002
- Preceded by: Stanley Noszka
- Succeeded by: Jim Ferlo

Democratic Whip of the Pennsylvania Senate
- In office November 18, 1992 – November 30, 2000
- Preceded by: William Lincoln
- Succeeded by: Michael O'Pake

Personal details
- Born: August 10, 1932 Pittsburgh, Pennsylvania
- Died: July 7, 2015 (aged 82) Pittsburgh, Pennsylvania
- Party: Democratic
- Spouse: Shirley M. Wagner
- Children: 6 children
- Education: Point Park College

Leonard J. Bodack (August 10, 1932 – July 7, 2015) was an American politician.

Born in Pittsburgh, Pennsylvania, Bodack served in the United States Marine Corps during the Korean War. He attended Point Park College. Bodack lived in Lawrenceville, Pennsylvania. Bodack was involved in the Democratic Party. Bodack served in the Pennsylvania State Senate from 1979 to 2002.

== Early life ==
Bodack was born in Pittsburgh, Pennsylvania in 1932, the son of Joseph and Mary Bodack. He attended Pittsburgh Academy and Point Park College. He served in the Marines from 1950 to 1954 and was a veteran of the Korean War.

== Career ==
Bodack represented the 38th district in the Pennsylvania Senate from 1979 to 2002. From 1996 to 2002, he was chairman of the Allegheny County Democratic Party. During the 1990s, Bodack served as the Pennsylvania State Senate's Democratic whip.

== Personal life ==
Bodack was married to Shirley Wagner and they had six children. Bodack died on July 7, 2015.
