= Jim Ferlo =

American politician (1951–2022)

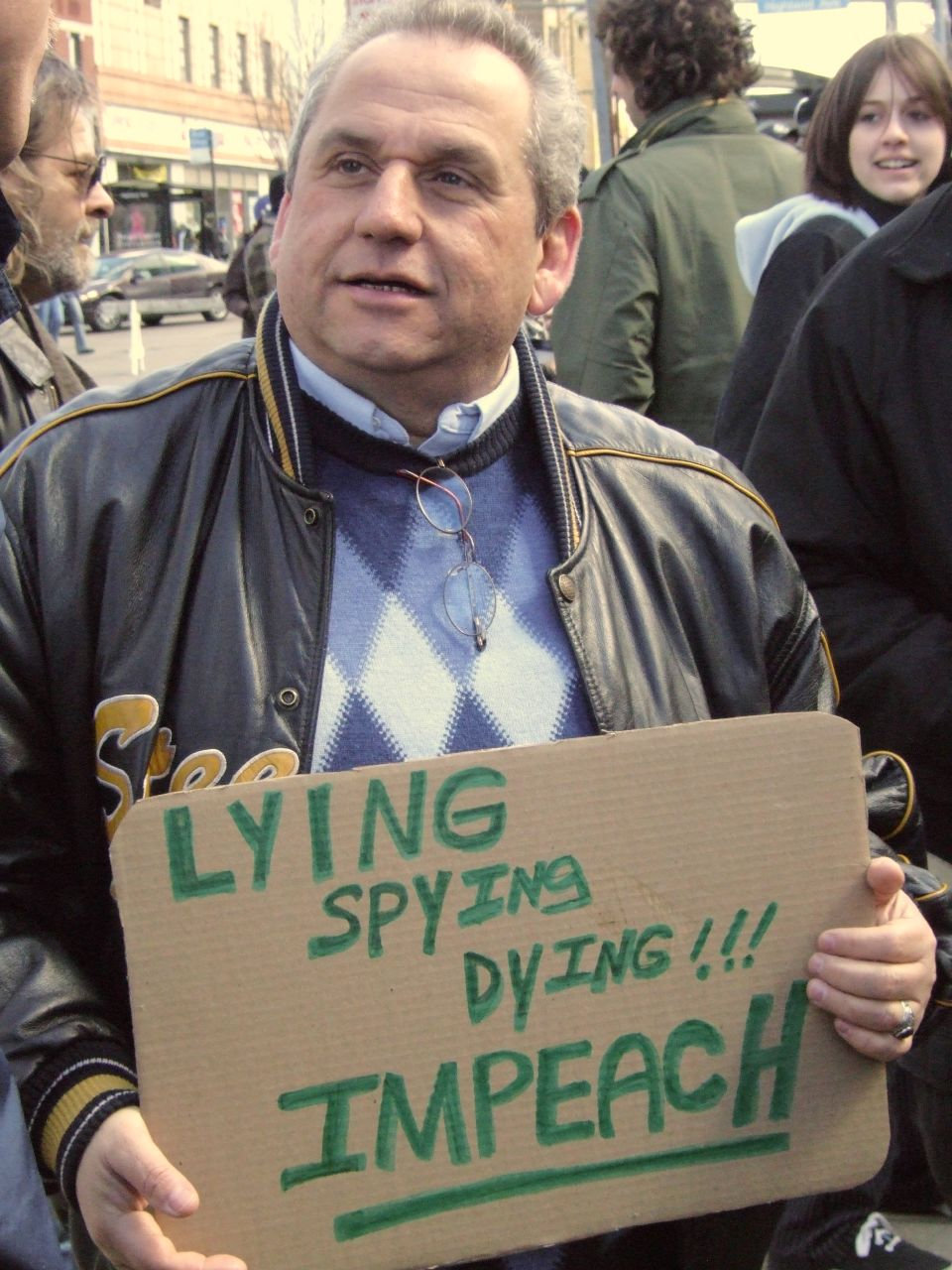
- Ferlo at an anti-war protest, 2006

Member of the Pennsylvania Senate from the 38th district
- In office January 7, 2003 – January 5, 2015
- Preceded by: Leonard Bodack
- Succeeded by: Randy Vulakovich

President of the Pittsburgh City Council
- In office January 3, 1994 – January 6, 1998
- Preceded by: Jack Wagner
- Succeeded by: Bob O'Connor

Member of the Pittsburgh City Council from the 7th District^{[a]}
- In office January 4, 1988 – January 7, 2003
- Preceded by: Stephen Grabowski
- Succeeded by: Leonard Bodack, Jr.

Personal details
- Born: May 19, 1951 Rome, New York, U.S.
- Died: May 15, 2022 (aged 70)
- Party: Democratic
- a.Ferlo was originally elected to Grabowski's at-large seat, but won re-election after a voter-approved referendum divided City Council seats into districts.

James Ferlo (May 19, 1951 – May 15, 2022) was an American politician who was a member of the Pennsylvania State Senate representing the 38th Senatorial District from 2003 to 2015. His district consisted of parts of Allegheny, Westmoreland, and Armstrong counties. He did not run for reelection in 2014.

== Background and career ==
Ferlo was born to Italian immigrant parents in the small upstate town of Rome, New York, and credited part of his legislative effectiveness as being one of ten siblings.

Ferlo was a liberal community activist in Pittsburgh before being elected to Pittsburgh City Council in 1987. He served on council for 15 years until his election to the State Senate in 2002. Ferlo served as president of City Council from 1994 to 1997.

A Democrat, Ferlo was elected to the state senate in 2002, receiving 65 percent of the vote to 35 percent for Republican candidate Ted Tomson. In 2003, the political website PoliticsPA named him to "The Best of the Freshman Class" list. Ferlo was overwhelmingly re-elected in 2006 in his heavily Democratic district. In that race, Ferlo received 84 percent of the vote, while his opponent Joe Murphy of the Constitution Party received 16 percent.

Following his 2014 retirement from the State Senate, Ferlo served two three-year terms on the board of directors of the ACLU of Pennsylvania. He also involved himself in a variety of community activities.

== Personal life ==
Ferlo came out as gay on September 23, 2014, thus becoming the Pennsylvania Senate's first openly gay legislator.

Ferlo died on May 15, 2022, aged 70.
