= Hal English =

American politician

Member of the Pennsylvania House of Representatives from the 30th district
- In office January 1, 2013 – January 1, 2019
- Preceded by: Randy Vulakovich
- Succeeded by: Lori Mizgorski

Personal details
- Party: Republican
- Education: West Virginia University; University of Baltimore
- Occupation: attorney

Harold A. "Hal" English is a Republican former member of the Pennsylvania House of Representatives. He represented the 30th District from 2013 to 2019.

English holds a bachelor's degree from West Virginia University and graduated from the law school at the University of Baltimore. He was an active duty member of the United States Marine Corps until 1991, and he participated in the reserves until his 2012 retirement at the rank of lieutenant colonel. A criminal trial attorney beginning in 1987, he started his own firm in 1998, which concentrates on estate and elder law.

For the 2018 election English dropped his name from the ballot. The replacement for English on the ballot was English's chief of staff, Lori Mizgorski, who defeated Betsy Monroe in the general election.
