= Shawn Flaherty =

American politician

Member of the Pennsylvania House of Representatives from the 30th district
- In office May 2, 2006 – November 30, 2006
- Preceded by: Jeff Habay
- Succeeded by: Randy Vulakovich

Personal details
- Party: Democratic
- Spouse: unmarried
- Children: 4 children

Shawn T. Flaherty is a former Democratic member of the Pennsylvania House of Representatives for the 30th legislative district. He was first elected in a special election in 2006 to fill the remainder of Jeff Habay's term. That November, Flaherty was defeated by Randy Vulakovich.

Flaherty, the eldest son of former Pittsburgh Mayor Pete Flaherty, graduated from Carnegie Mellon University in 1981 and earned a law degree from the Duquesne University School of Law in 1985. He founded the Pittsburgh-based law firm Woodruff, Flaherty & Fardo LLC with attorney and former Steeler Dwayne D. Woodruff.
