= David J. Steil =

American politician

Member of the Pennsylvania House of Representatives from the 31st district
- In office January 5, 1993 – November 30, 2008
- Preceded by: Daniel L. Anderson
- Succeeded by: Steve Santarsiero

Personal details
- Born: March 19, 1942 (age 84) Cold Spring, Minnesota
- Party: Republican
- Education: St. John's University; University of Minnesota
- Website: www.davidsteil.com

David J. Steil (born March 19, 1942) is a Republican politician who was a member of the Pennsylvania House of Representatives for the 31st District, being elected in 1992.

== Biography ==
Steil and his wife live in Yardley, Pennsylvania and have two children. He retired prior to the 2008 election, and was succeeded by Democrat Steve Santarsiero.

== Life after the Pennsylvania House ==
Steil went on to become a supporter of Medicare for All in 2019, writing an op-ed in the USA Today that he "believe[s] it’s possible for markets to fail, because there are services that they’re incapable of providing efficiently". Continuing by stating "There’s no better example [of a market failure] than our health insurance system." As of the time of authoring that op-ed, he was the CEO for the MicroTrap Corporation.
