= List of Delta Tau Delta chapters =

Delta Tau Delta is an international college fraternity. It was founded at Bethany College, Bethany, Virginia, (now West Virginia) in 1858. In the early years of the fraternity, chapter names were assigned, removed, and reassigned in rapid succession. There are at least two incidents of the same name being issued simultaneously. Other chapters selected names and began operating without authorization from the national fraternity; while some were eventually authorized, others were disbanded. All records from Alpha Prime were lost; Alpha Third was lax in record keeping and ended in scandal. As a result, there are information gaps, especially from 1858 to 1875.

In 1877, James Eaton constructed a multi-part history of the fraternity for the Crescent magazine from his memory as the founder of multiple chapters, from the fraternity's records, and interviews with living chapter founders. He documented chapters and name changes that were unknown to William Raimond Baird when he published the first edition of his Baird's Manual of American College Fraternities in 1879. For example, Baird lists Mount Union College as Sigma Second but does not list Sigma Prime or the two other Sigma chapters that predated Mount Union. Baird also lists charter dates, but leaves the institution's name blank in some instances. Eaton often fills in those blanks, but tends to list institutions by place name only, which presents a different set of challenges.

In the following Delta Tau Delta chapter list, active chapters are indicated in bold and inactive chapters and institutions are in italics.

Chapter	Charter date and range	Institution	Location	Status	Ref.
Alpha Prime (see Eta Prime)	1858–1860	Bethany College	Bethany, West Virginia	Inactive	(Note: Chapter closed due to the Civil War. Rechartered as Eta Prime.)
Alpha Second (see Gamma)	February 21, 1861 – c. 1867	Jefferson College	Washington, Pennsylvania	Consolidated	(Note: After the closing of the Bethany College chapter in 1860, this chapter assumed the national leadership role in 1861 and was called Alpha. According to Eaton, its previous name was not documented by the fraternity, but as the second chapter, it appears to have been Beta Prime. This chapter merged with the Gamma chapter when the two colleges merged to create Washington & Jefferson College. The name Alpha was transferred to the Ohio Wesleyan chapter when it became the fraternity's headquarters.)
Alpha Third (see Omicron Prime and **Mu Third**)	1868–1874	Ohio Wesleyan University	Delaware, Ohio	Active	(Note: This chapter started as Omicron in 1864 and became the third chapter to be called Alpha when it took on the national leadership role in 1868. Alpha Second closed in 1874 when its members sold its assets, illegally pocketing the proceeds and joining another fraternity. It was later re-established as the Mu chapter.)
**Alpha** (see Delta Second)	1875–1997, 2001	Allegheny College	Meadville, Pennsylvania	Active	(Note: This was the Delta chapter from July 1863 to 1875. It became the fourth Alpha chapter when it took on the national leadership role.)
Beta	June 1862–2009, 2018–2021	Ohio University	Athens, Ohio	Inactive	(Note: In 2010, the chapter pled no contest to a hazing charge and received a five-year suspension. It was again suspended for four years in 2021 for hazing and distributing alcohol.)
Gamma Prime	July 1, 1861 – 1862	West Liberty College	West Liberty, West Virginia	Inactive	(Note: Chapter closed because of the Civil War, during which its founder was killed.)
**Gamma** (see Alpha Second)	February 22, 1861	Washington & Jefferson College	Washington, Pennsylvania	Active	(Note: The Alpha chapter at Jefferson College consolidated with the Gamma chapter at Washington College, shortly after the colleges merged into Washington & Jefferson College.)
Delta Prime	1861–1862	Morgantown Academy	Morgantown, West Virginia	Inactive	(Note: Chapter closed because of the Civil War and its charter was withdrawn. Morgantown Academy ceased operations circa 1862.)
Delta Second (see Alpha)	July 1863–1875	Allegheny College	Meadville, Pennsylvania	Reissued	(Note: This chapter became the fourth to be called Alpha when it took on the national leadership role in 1874; its name was officially changed at the 1875 convention.)
**Delta** (see Beta Beta prime)	1880–2005, 2007	University of Michigan	Ann Arbor, Michigan	Active	(Note: Known as Beta Beta chapter from 1875 to 1877. The fraternity withdrew its charter in 1877 because the chapter was "illegally instituted", according to Eaton.)
Epsilon Prime	October 21, 1861 – c. 1862	Franklin College	New Athens, Ohio	Inactive	(Note: Its founder graduated in 1861 and died in 1863. The fraternity never issued an official charter to this chapter.)
Epsilon Second (see Iota Pime)	November 11, 1864 – 1875	Western University of Pennsylvania	Pittsburgh, Pennsylvania	Inactive	(Note: Chapter named changed from Iota to Epsilon sometime between 1864 and 1869. The fraternity withdrew the chapter's charter in 1875.)
**Epsilon**	1876	Albion College	Albion, Michigan	Active	
Zeta Prime	1865 – March 29, 1871	Monmouth College	Monmouth, Illinois	Inactive	(Note: Chapter closed when college banned fraternities.)
**Zeta**	1882–1894, 1895	Case Western Reserve University	Cleveland, Ohio	Active	
Eta Prime (see Pi Prime and Theta)	January 26, 1864 – 1865	Bethany College	Bethany, West Virginia	Inactive	(Note: This chapter was previously Alpha prime. After the Civil War, it was re-chartered as Pi chapter, but its name was changed to Eta chapter shortly afterwards.)
Eta	1873–1895, 1972–2004	University of Akron	Akron, Ohio	Inactive	(Note: Chapter was formed at Buchtel College, now the University of Akron.)
**Theta** (see Pi Prime)	c. 1870–1895, 1966	Bethany College	Bethany, West Virginia	Active	(Note: Pi Prime was re-established Theta chapter before 1874, probably in 1870, according to Eaton. This chapter was previously Alpha Prime and Eta Prime. It was re-established in 1966 from Delta Phi Delta, established in 1965.)
Iota Prime (see Epsilon Second)	November 11, 1864 – 186x ?	Western University (now University of Pittsburgh)	Pittsburgh, Pennsylvania	Inactive, Reissued	(Note: Changed to Epsilon chapter sometime between 1864 and 1869.)
Iota Second	February 20, 1868 – 1871	Jamestown Collegiate Institute	Jamestown, New York	Inactive	(Note: Baird calls this Iota chapter. Eaton calls it Rho. Both agree on its founding year and its short life. The fraternity withdrew the chapter's charter. Jamestown Collegiate Institute ceased operations circa 1875.)
Iota (see Xi prime)	May 3, 1872 – 1897; 1947–1997; 2000–2004	Michigan State University	East Lansing, Michigan	Inactive	(Note: A prior charter for this campus was called the Xi chapter.)
Kappa Prime	December 14, 1865 – 1868	Poughkeepsie Institute	Poughkeepsie, New York	Inactive	(Note: The fraternity withdrew the chapter's charter. The Poughkeepsie Institute ceased operations circa 1868.)
**Kappa** (see Sigma Prime)	1869–2003, 2009	Hillsdale College	Hillsdale, Michigan	Active	(Note: Started as Sigma Prime chapter in 1867. Its name was probably changed because of a brief closure of the chapter.)
Lambda Prime	February 4, 1869 – 1885	Lombard University	Galesburg, Illinois	Inactive	(Note: Chapter formed from the Delta Theta Society, established in 1867.)
Lambda	1886–1930, 2014–2020	Vanderbilt University	Nashville, Tennessee	Inactive	(Note: Chapter formed from a national merger with W.W.W. Rainbow, from a chapter established in 1881. It disbanded in 2020 in protest of the history of racism, misogyny, and sexual assault in the organization.)
Mu Prime	1861–1862	Waynesburg College	Waynesburg, Pennsylvania	Inactive	(Note: Baird calls this Nu chapter, but Eaton says it was Mu chapter. The latter works better with the founding date of the Nu chapter at Lafayette College. The chapter closed because of the Civil War.)
Mu Second (see Beta Alpha)	December 26, 1870 – 1875	Indiana University	Bloomington, Indiana	Inactive, Reissued	(Note: Chapter was re-established as Beta Alpha chapter.)
**Mu (Mu Third)** (see Omicron Prime and Alpha Third)	1879	Ohio Wesleyan University	Delaware, Ohio	Active	(Note: Started as Omicron charter in 1864 and became the third Alpha chapter, when it took on the national leadership role in 1868. It dissolved in 1874 and became the Mu chapter when it was re-founded.)
Nu Prime	1873–1877	Iowa Wesleyan College	Mount Pleasant, Iowa	Inactive	(Note: Reformed as Chi chapter in 1875)
**Nu**	December 3, 1874 – 1893; 1906–1988; 2016	Lafayette College	Easton, Pennsylvania	Active	**(Note: Eaton says this duplicated the name of an active chapter, although there were signs that Nu Prime was about to close. It was reestablished in 1906 from Skull & Raven, established in 1901.)**
Xi Prime (See Iota)	March 1871 – 1872	Michigan State University	East Lansing, Michigan	Inactive	(Note: Re-established as the Iota chapter.)
Xi	May 8, 1873 – 1894	Simpson Centenary College	Indianola, Iowa	Inactive	
Omicron Prime (see Alpha Third and **Mu Third**)	December 14, 1866 – 1868	Ohio Wesleyan University	Delaware, Ohio	Reissued	(Note: It became the Alpha chapter when it took on the national leadership role in 1868. Omicron Prime/Alpha Second closed in 1874 when some members sold its assets, illegally pocketing the proceeds and joining another fraternity. It was later reestablished as the Mu chapter.)
Omicron Second (see **Beta Beta**)	March 18, 1871 – 1874; 1875–1880	Indiana Asbury University	Greencastle, Indiana	Inactive, Reissued	(Note: Re-established as Beta Beta chapter.)
Omicron Third (see Tau)	1874 – 1874	Franklin & Marshall College	Lancaster, Pennsylvania	Reissued	(Note: Chapter formed from Upsilon Beta, established in the 1860s. Its name was changed to Tau chapter because of accidental duplication of the name Omicron.)
**Omicron**	1880–1999, 2013	University of Iowa	Iowa City, Iowa	Active	
Pi Prime (see Theta and Eta Prime)	March 30, 1867 – c. 1869	Bethany College	Bethany, West Virginia	Inactive, Reissued	(Note: This chapter was previously established as Alpha prime and Eta prime. It later became the Theta chapter.)
Pi Second (see Beta Lambda)	May 29, 1874 – 1885	Lehigh University	Bethlehem, Pennsylvania	Inactive, Reissued	(Note: Chapter formed from a chapter of Upsilon Beta, established in 1870, when that fraternity went extinct. After going inactive, the chapter was re-established as the Beta Lambda chapter.)
**Pi**	1886–1912, 1926–1942, 2023	University of Mississippi	Oxford, Mississippi	Active	(Note: Chapter formed from a national merger with W.W.W. Rainbow, from a chapter established in 1848. It reformed in 1926 from the Rainbow Club, established in 1924.)
Rho Prime	December 30, 1871 – 1875	Lake Shore Seminary	North East, New York	Inactive	(Note: Charter was withdrawn at the 1875 national convention. Lake Shore Seminary ceased operations in 1881.)
**Rho**	May 9, 1874	Stevens Institute of Technology	Hoboken, New Jersey	Active	(Note: Rho chapter was assigned while Rho Prime was still chartered. Eaton attributes this to "negligence" by the fraternity's administration.)
Sigma Prime (see **Kappa**)	October 9, 1867 – 1869	Hillsdale College	Hillsdale, Michigan	Reissued	(Note: By 1869, this group was called the Kappa chapter, probably because it dissolved and reorganized.)
Sigma Second	1874–1886	Mount Union College	Alliance, Ohio	Inactive	(Note: Chapter was established when a Kappa Phi Lambda chapter, established in 1862, merged with ΔΤΔ at the previous fraternity's demise. Eaton writes that a second Sigma chapter was established in Fairfield, Illinois on December 19, 1871. The name of that school is currently unknown. Also in 1871, the Sigma chapter was started at Franklin College, Indiana; that chapter was dissolved in February 1872 because of sanctions and later re-established as the Chi chapter. This name listing follows the convention established in Baird of calling the Mount Union College chapter Sigma Second.)
Sigma	1891–1896	Williams College	Williamstown, Massachusetts	Inactive	
Tau Prime	February 18, 1872 – 1873; 1912–1968; 1977–2018	Pennsylvania State University	State College, Pennsylvania	Inactive	(Note: Chapter formed at the Pennsylvania Agricultural College, now Pennsylvania State University. After going dormant, it reformed in 1921 from Alpha Kappa Delta, established in 1912, and in 1977 from Alpha Lambda Tau, established in 1975. Penn State suspended Delta Tau Delta in October 2017 after issues related to alcohol.)
Tau (See Omicron Third)	1874–1895	Franklin & Marshall College	Lancaster, Pennsylvania	Inactive	(Note: Previously the Omicron chapter.)
Upsilon Prime (see **Beta Upsilon**)	November 29, 1871 – 1879	Illinois Industrial Institute	Urbana, Illinois	Inactive, Reissued	(Note: Reformed as Beta Upsilon chapter in 1894.)
**Upsilon**	1879	Rensselaer Polytechnic Institute	Troy, New York	Active	
Phi Prime	February 7, 1872 – 1895	Hanover College	Hanover, Indiana	Inactive	(Note: Chapter formed from the Epsilon chapter of Sigma Alpha Theta, established in the 1860s. Sigma Alpha Theta was a small regional fraternity that ceased operations just after the Civil War.)
Phi	1896–1992	Washington and Lee University	Lexington, Virginia	Inactive	(Note: Chapter formed from the Alpha chapter of a regional fraternity named Phi Theta Psi, established in 1885. It withdrew from that fraternity when merger talks with Sigma Alpha Epsilon broke down in 1896, and joined Delta Tau Delta that same year.)
Chi Prime	February 1869 – 1880	Westminster College	New Wilmington, Pennsylvania	Inactive	
Chi Second	1871 – February 5, 1872; 1872–1877	Franklin College	Franklin, Indiana	Inactive	(Note: Eaton says it started as Sigma chapter in 1871, but its charter was withdrawn on February 5, 1872, because of sanctions. It received a new charter later in 1872 as the Chi chapter.)
Chi Third	1878–1880	Iowa Wesleyan College	Mount Pleasant, Iowa	Inactive	(Note: Was previously the Nu chapter.)
**Chi**	1881	Kenyon College	Gambier, Ohio	Active	
Psi Prime (see **Beta Psi**)	1872–c. 1872	Wabash College	Crawfordsville, Indiana	Inactive	
Psi Second	1873–1876	name unknown	Lexington, Kentucky	Inactive	
Psi	1880-1895, 1910–1914	College of Wooster	Wooster, Ohio	Inactive	(Note: Chapter formed from the Ozarks Club (local), established in 1868. It closed when the college banned national fraternities in 1913. The Wooster chapter's successor was Phi Omega Sigma (local), or "IV Section", active from 1913 to 2017. See List of fraternities and sororities at the College of Wooster.)
Omega Prime (see Gamma Pi)	1875–1894	Iowa Agricultural College	Ames, Iowa	Inactive, Reissued	(Note: Reformed as Gamma Pi chapter in 1911.)
Omega	1897–1971, 1992–1999, 2005-2021	University of Pennsylvania	Philadelphia, Pennsylvania	Inactive	
Alpha Beta	February 6, 1875 – 1876	Abingdon College	Abingdon, Illinois	Inactive	(Note: Chapter closed when college banned fraternities.)
**Beta Alpha** (see Mu Second)	1887–2016	Indiana University	Bloomington, Indiana	Colony	(Note: This chapter was the re-establishment of Mu Second chapter. In January 2017, the university suspended the chapter for one year because of multiple hazing violations. It was reestablished as a colony in 2022.)
Beta Beta prime (see **Delta**)	1875–1877	University of Michigan	Ann Arbor, Michigan	Inactive, Reissued	(Note: Fraternity withdrew the chapter's charter because it had been "illegally instituted" according to Eaton. Re-established as the Delta chapter.)
**Beta Beta** (see Omicron Second)	1882	DePauw University	Greencastle, Indiana	Active	(Note: Was the Omicron chapter from 1871 to 1874 and 1875 to 1880.)
Beta Gamma Prime	1875–1876	Indiana Normal School	Indiana County, Pennsylvania	Inactive	(Note: Fraternity withdrew the charter because the chapter was "illegally instituted" according to Eaton.)
**Beta Gamma**	1888–1890, 1892–1969, 1979	University of Wisconsin–Madison	Madison, Wisconsin	Active	
**Beta Delta**	1882–1902, 1911–1997, 2000	University of Georgia	Athens, Georgia	Active	(Note: Reestablished in 1911 from the Utopian Club, established in 1911.)
Beta Epsilon Prime	1877–1880	Illinois Wesleyan University	Bloomington, Illinois	Inactive	
Beta Epsilon	1882–1983, 1989–2008, 2017-2026	Emory University	Atlanta, Georgia	Inactive	
Beta Eta Prime	1874–187x ?	Western University		Inactive	
**Beta Zeta**	1875–1876, 1878–1996, 2000	Butler University	Indianapolis, Indiana	Active	(Note: Reestablished in 2000 from Alpha Tau Gamma, established in 1998.)
**Beta Eta**	1883	University of Minnesota	Minneapolis and Saint Paul, Minnesota	Active	
**Beta Theta**	1883	Sewanee: The University of the South	Sewanee, Tennessee	Active	
Beta Iota Prime	1878–1884	Adrian College	Adrian, Michigan	Inactive	
Beta Iota	1889–1893, 1898–1946, 1971–2006	University of Virginia	Charlottesville, Virginia	Inactive	(Note: Reestablished in 1971 from a Alpha Kappa Pi chapter, established in 1969.)
**Beta Kappa**	1883–1989, 2023	University of Colorado	Boulder, Colorado	Active	
Beta Lambda (see Pi Second)	1889–1981, 1985–2011	Lehigh University	Bethlehem, Pennsylvania	Inactive	(Note: Re-establishment of the Pi chapter. In 2011, the chapter was suspended for three years for hazing pledges.)
**Beta Mu**	1889–2004, 2010	Tufts University	Medford and Somerville, Massachusetts	Active	
**Beta Nu**	1889	Massachusetts Institute of Technology	Cambridge, Massachusetts	Active	
**Beta Xi**	1889–1990, 2002	Tulane University	New Orleans, Louisiana	Active	
**Beta Omicron**	1890	Cornell University	Ithaca, New York	Active	
**Beta Pi**	1893–1981, 1984–2007, 2014	Northwestern University	Evanston, Illinois	Active	(Note: Chapter formed from Alpha Mu, established in 1890.)
Beta Rho	1893–1973, 1978-2024	Stanford University	Stanford, California	Inactive	
**Beta Sigma**	1889–1893, 1991–1999, 2014	Boston University	Boston, Massachusetts	Active	(Note: Reestablished in 1991 from Beta Sigma, established in 1887. Suspended for underage drinking in 2015.)
**Beta Tau**	1893–2018, 2019	University of Nebraska–Lincoln	Lincoln, Nebraska	Active	(Note: In August 2018, the University of Nebraska-Lincoln ordered the chapter to cease operations because of hazing. The university reinstated the chapter in the fall of 2019.)
**Beta Upsilon** (see Upsilon Prime)	1894	University of Illinois Urbana-Champaign	Urbana, Illinois	Active	(Note: This was the Upsilon Prime chapter from 1872 to 1879.)
**Beta Phi**	1894–2002, 2006	Ohio State University	Columbus, Ohio	Active	(Note: In 2018, the chapter of Delta Tau Delta was put on probation for an alcohol violation, followed by a hazing violation in 2019. In 2000, the university again placed Delta Tau Delta on probation after the alcohol-related death of one of its members. Four months after its probation ended, two students were assaulted at a Delt party and were taken to the hospital. In 2002, the national fraternity revoked the chapter's charter for grades.)
Beta Chi	1896–1969, 1983–1992	Brown University	Providence, Rhode Island	Inactive	(Note: Chapter was reestablished in 1983 from Delta Tau, established in 1969.)
**Beta Psi** (see Psi Prime)	1872-1879, 1894–2008, 2016	Wabash College	Crawfordsville, Indiana	Active	(Note: Reestablished in 1894 from Alpha Theta Phi, established in 1890.)
Beta Omega	1898–1974, 1981–20xx ?	University of California, Berkeley	Berkeley, California	Inactive	
Gamma Alpha	1898–1935, 2014–2016	University of Chicago	Chicago, Illinois	Inactive	(Note: Chapter formed from the Black Dragon club, established in 1897.)
**Gamma Beta**	1901	Illinois Institute of Technology	Chicago, Illinois	Active	(Note: Chapter formed from the Consonant Club, established in 1900.)
Gamma Gamma	1901–1960	Dartmouth College	Hanover, New Hampshire	Inactive	(Note: In 1962 this former chapter formed Bones Gate, a local Dartmouth fraternity that is unaffiliated with ΔΤΔ.)
Gamma Delta	1860–1864, 1900–1991, 1996–2006, 2013–2016	West Virginia University	Morgantown, West Virginia	Inactive	(Note: The national fraternity suspended the chapter indefinitely for filming an inappropriate audition for the "Real World" TV series.)
Gamma Epsilon	1882–1886, 1902–1928	Columbia University	New York City, New York	Inactive	
Gamma Zeta	1902–1971, 1979–1989	Wesleyan University	Middletown, Connecticut	Inactive	(Note: Chapter formed from Phi Rho (local), established in 1893.)
**Gamma Eta**	1903–2004, 2010	George Washington University	Washington, D.C.	Active	
**Gamma Theta**	1903	Baker University	Baldwin City, Kansas	Active	(Note: Chapter formed from Alpha Omega (local), established in 1888.)
**Gamma Iota**	1904	University of Texas at Austin	Austin, Texas	Active	
**Gamma Kappa**	1905	University of Missouri	Columbia, Missouri	Active	
**Gamma Lambda**	1907	Purdue University	West Lafayette, Indiana	Active	(Note: Chapter formed from the Coterie Club, established in 1903.)
**Gamma Mu**	1908	University of Washington	Seattle, Washington	Active	(Note: Chapter formed from Delta Delta, established in 1907.)
**Gamma Nu**	1908–1997, 2004	University of Maine	Orono, Maine	Active	(Note: Chapter formed from Omega Lambda Upsilon, established in 1904. After going inactive, it reformed from Alpha Nu Kappa, established in 2002.)
**Gamma Xi**	1909	University of Cincinnati	Cincinnati, Ohio	Active	(Note: Chapter formed from Alpha Mu Alpha, established in 1905.)
**Gamma Omicron**	1910–1935; 1948–2017; January 25, 2025	Syracuse University	Syracuse, New York	Active	(Note: Chapter formed from Phi Mu Alpha, established in 1904. It was suspended in October 2017 for hazing.)
**Gamma Pi** (see Omega Prime)	1911	Iowa State University	Ames, Iowa	Active	(Note: Was Omega Prime chapter from 1875 to 1894. It reformed in 1911 from the Hawkeye Club, established in 1904.)
**Gamma Rho**	1913	University of Oregon	Eugene, Oregon	Active	(Note: Chapter formed from Zeta Phi, established in 1909.)
Gamma Sigma	1864–1871, 1877–1879, 1914–2016, 2019–2026	University of Pittsburgh	Pittsburgh, Pennsylvania	Inactive	(Note: In 1914, it was reestablished from Alpha Alpha (local), established in 1902.)
**Gamma Tau**	1914–2001, 2009	University of Kansas	Lawrence, Kansas	Active	(Note: Chapter formed from the Kletz Club, established in 1911.)
Gamma Upsilon	1916–2001, 2007–2019	Miami University	Oxford, Ohio	Inactive	(Note: Chapter was formed from Omega Psi Rho, established in 1912. It was suspended for three years in 2000 and recolonized in 2005. It was suspended for hazing from 2019 until 2034.)
Gamma Phi	1918–1946	Amherst College	Amherst, Massachusetts	Inactive	(Note: Chapter formed from Kappa Theta, established in 1907.)
Gamma Chi	1919–2013	Kansas State University	Manhattan, Kansas	Inactive	(Note: Chapter formed from the Aztec Club (local), established in 1910.)
**Gamma Psi**	1921	Georgia Tech	Atlanta, Georgia	Active	(Note: Chapter formed from Pi Phi Delta, established in 1919.)
Gamma Omega	1921–1935; 1977–1996; April 21, 2018 – 2020	University of North Carolina at Chapel Hill	Chapel Hill, North Carolina	Inactive	(Note: Chapter formed from Delta Psi Delta, established in 1925. It withdrew and became Delta Sigma Pi in 1935. It reformed as a colony in 2017.)
**Delta Alpha**	1922	University of Oklahoma	Norman, Oklahoma	Active	(Note: Chapter formed from Delta Sigma Delta, established in 1919.)
**Delta Beta**	1923–2005, 2010	Carnegie Mellon University	Pittsburgh, Pennsylvania	Active	(Note: Chapter formed from Tau Gamma Phi, established in 1915.)
**Delta Gamma**	1924	University of South Dakota	Vermillion, South Dakota	Active	(Note: Chapter formed from Alpha Tau, established in 1920.)
**Delta Delta**	1924–2006, 2009–2021, 2024	University of Tennessee	Knoxville, Tennessee	Active	(Note: Chapter formed from Beta Sigma Alpha, established in 1919.)
**Delta Epsilon**	1924	University of Kentucky	Lexington, Kentucky	Active	(Note: Chapter formed from Tau Delta Alpha, established in 1919.)
**Delta Zeta**	1925	University of Florida	Gainesville, Florida	Active	(Note: Chapter formed from Phi Gamma Sigma, established in 1921.)
**Delta Eta**	1925	University of Alabama	Tuscaloosa, Alabama	Active	(Note: Chapter formed from Tau Phi, established in 1923.)
Delta Theta	1926–1989	University of Toronto	Toronto, Ontario, Canada	Inactive	(Note: Chapter formed from Psi Delta Psi, established in 1906.)
Delta Iota	1926–1973, 1976–1995, 2005–2024	University of California, Los Angeles	Los Angeles, California	Inactive	(Note: Chapter formed from Delta Phi Pi, established in 1921.)
**Delta Kappa**	1928–1994, 2005	Duke University	Durham, North Carolina	Active	(Note: Chapter formed from Delta Delta, established in 1925.)
**Delta Lambda**	1930–1999, 2018	Oregon State University	Corvallis, Oregon	Active	(Note: Chapter formed from Omega Upsilon, established in 1918.)
**Delta Mu**	1931	University of Idaho	Moscow, Idaho	Active	(Note: Chapter formed from Beta Chi, established in 1924.)
**Delta Nu**	1935	Lawrence University	Appleton, Wisconsin	Active	(Note: Chapter formed from Delta Iota, established in 1903.)
**Delta Xi**	1935	University of North Dakota	Grand Forks, North Dakota	Active	(Note: Chapter formed from Beta Chi, established in 1924.)
**Delta Omicron**	1939	Westminster College	Fulton, Missouri	Active	(Note: Chapter formed from the York Club, established in 1931.)
**Delta Pi**	1941–1981, 1984–1993, 2003	University of Southern California	Los Angeles, California	Active	
Delta Rho	1948–1974	Whitman College	Walla Walla, Washington	Inactive	
Delta Sigma	1948–2008	University of Maryland, College Park	College Park, Maryland	Inactive	(Note: Chapter formed from Kappa Sigma Kappa, established in 1947.)
**Delta Tau**	1948	Bowling Green State University	Bowling Green, Ohio	Active	(Note: Chapter formed from Kappa Tau, established in 1947.)
**Delta Upsilon**	1948–1994, 2012	University of Delaware	Newark, Delaware	Active	(Note: Chapter formed from Delta Sigma, established in 1947.)
Delta Phi	1949–1968, 1979–September 2019	Florida State University	Tallahassee, Florida	Inactive	(Note: The national fraternity closed the chapter in September 2019 over allegations of hazing.)
**Delta Chi**	1949	Oklahoma State University–Stillwater	Stillwater, Oklahoma	Active	
**Delta Psi**	1949–1966, 1982–1988, 2011	University of California, Santa Barbara	Santa Barbara, California	Active	(Note: Chapter formed from Sigma Alpha Kappa, established in 1925.)
**Delta Omega**	1955	Kent State University	Kent, Ohio	Active	
**Epsilon Alpha**	1952–1999, 2004	Auburn University	Auburn, Alabama	Active	(Note: Chapter formed from the Crescent Club, established in 1950.)
Epsilon Beta	1955–January 2018	Texas Christian University	Fort Worth, Texas	Inactive	(Note: Delta Tau Delta fraternity suspended the chapter in January 2018 for hazing incidents in the fall semester.)
**Epsilon Gamma**	1956	Washington State University	Pullman, Washington	Active	(Note: Chapter formed from Kappa Iota Phi, established in 1938.)
**Epsilon Delta**	1957–1998, 2002	Texas Tech University	Lubbock, Texas	Active	(Note: Chapter formed from Tau Delta Tau, established in 1956.)
**Epsilon Epsilon**	1959–2015, 2025	University of Arizona	Tucson, Arizona	Active	(Note: Chapter formed from the Crescent Club, established in 1957. It was disbanded for hazing in 2015.)[d]
**Epsilon Zeta**	1960	Sam Houston State University	Huntsville, Texas	Active	(Note: Chapter formed from the Esquire Social Club, established in 1938.)
**Epsilon Eta**	1961	East Texas A&M University	Commerce, Texas	Active	(Note: Chapter formed from the Cavaliers, established in 1950 at Texas A&M University at Commerce, now East Texas A&M University.)
Epsilon Theta	1963–1997	Willamette University	Salem, Oregon	Inactive	(Note: Chapter formed from the Crescent Club, established in 1962.)
**Epsilon Iota**	1963	Kettering University	Flint, Michigan	Active	(Note: Chapter formed from Gamma Mu Tau, established in 1925.)
**Epsilon Kappa**	1966–1999; April 2024	Louisiana State University	Baton Rouge, Louisiana	Active	(Note: Chapter formed from Alpha Tau Delta, established in 1965.)
Epsilon Lambda	1966–1998	Texas A&M University–Kingsville	Kingsville, Texas	Inactive	(Note: Chapter formed from Beta Sigma Lambda, established in 1963.)
**Epsilon Mu**	1966	Ball State University	Muncie, Indiana	Active	(Note: Chapter formed from Phi Delta Gamma, established in 1963.)
**Epsilon Nu**	1966	Missouri University of Science and Technology	Rolla, Missouri	Active	(Note: Chapter formed from Kappa Phi, established in 1963.)
Epsilon Xi	1967–July 22, 2014; November 2020-August 2026	Western Kentucky University	Bowling Green, Kentucky	Inactive	(Note: Chapter formed from Phi Phi Kappa, established in 1939. The national fraternity suspended the chapter in 2014 for low membership and poor academic performance.)
**Epsilon Omicron**	1967–1972, 1990–2015, 2023	Colorado State University	Fort Collins, Colorado	Active	
**Epsilon Pi**	1968–1992, 2017	University of South Florida	Tampa, Florida	Active	(Note: Chapter formed from Zeta Phi Epsilon, established in 1963.)
**Epsilon Rho**	1968–1992, 2021	University of Texas at Arlington	Arlington, Texas	Active	(Note: Chapter formed from the Aegeidae Club, established in 1963.)
Epsilon Sigma	1968–1980	Athens State University	Athens, Alabama	Inactive	(Note: Chapter formed from Rho Alpha Omega, established in 1965.)
Epsilon Tau	1968–1979	University of Wisconsin–Milwaukee	Milwaukee, Wisconsin	Inactive	(Note: Chapter formed from the Delta Society, established in 1967.)
**Epsilon Upsilon**	1968	Marietta College	Marietta, Ohio	Active	(Note: Chapter formed from Beta Delta Epsilon, established in 1966.)
**Epsilon Phi**	1969	Southeastern Louisiana University	Hammond, Louisiana	Active	(Note: Chapter formed from Alpha Tau Delta, established in 1967.)
Epsilon Chi	1969–1972	Northern Michigan University	Marquette, Michigan	Inactive	(Note: Chapter formed from Chi Sigma Nu, established in 1961.)
**Epsilon Psi**	1969–1985, 2021	University of Louisiana at Lafayette	Lafayette, Louisiana	Active	(Note: Chapter formed from the Crescent Club, established in 1967.)
**Epsilon Omega**	1969–2001, 2007–2019, 2026-	Georgia Southern University	Statesboro, Georgia	Active	(Note: Chapter formed from Delta Tau, established in 1967. It lost its national charter due to hazing in 2018.)
**Zeta Alpha**	1970–1979, 2016	Marquette University	Milwaukee, Wisconsin	Active	(Note: Chapter formed from Alpha Delta Sigma, established in 1954.)
**Zeta Beta**	1970	LaGrange College	LaGrange, Georgia	Active	(Note: Chapter formed from Sigma Nu Pi, established in 1953)
Zeta Gamma	1970–1976	Lamar University	Beaumont, Texas	Inactive	(Note: Chapter formed from the Crescent Club, established in 1968.)
**Zeta Delta**	1970–2017, 2025-	Texas State University	San Marcos, Texas	Active	(Note: Chapter formed from Sigma Chi Epsilon, established in 1967. In February 2017, the chapter received a five-year suspension from Texas State for co-hosting a 3,000-person party with alcohol.)
Zeta Epsilon	1970–1976	Tennessee Technological University	Cookeville, Tennessee	Inactive	(Note: Chapter formed from Alpha Sigma Psi, established in 1967.)
**Zeta Zeta**	1970	Morehead State University	Morehead, Kentucky	Active	(Note: Chapter formed from Sigma Chi Alpha, established in 1967.)
Zeta Eta	1971–1976, 1990–1999	Minnesota State University, Mankato	Mankato, Minnesota	Inactive	(Note: After going inactive, the chapter was reestablished from Gamma Beta Delta, established in 1989.)
**Zeta Theta**	1971	Villanova University	Villanova, Pennsylvania	Active	(Note: Chapter formed from Kappa Chi, established in 1970.)
**Zeta Iota**	1972–1999, 2024	University of West Florida	Pensacola, Florida	Active	(Note: Chapter formed from Delta Tau Omega, established in 1968.)
Zeta Kappa	1972–1997	Middle Tennessee State University	Murfreesboro, Tennessee	Inactive	(Note: Chapter formed from Sigma Iota Nu, established in 1969.)
**Zeta Lambda**	1972	Western Illinois University	Macomb, Illinois	Active	(Note: Chapter formed from Phi Delta, established in 1970.)
**Zeta Mu**	1973	Robert Morris University	Moon Township, Pennsylvania	Active	(Note: Chapter formed from Phi Delta Mu, established in 1968.)
Zeta Nu	1973–1981	Jacksonville State University	Jacksonville, Alabama	Inactive	(Note: Chapter formed from Pi Chi, established in 1969.)
Zeta Xi	1974–1980	University of West Georgia	Carrollton, Georgia	Inactive	(Note: Chapter formed from Delta Omega, established in 1971.)
**Zeta Omicron**	1975–2012, 2024	University of Central Florida	Orlando, Florida	Active	
Zeta Pi	1976–2013	Indiana University of Pennsylvania	Indiana, Pennsylvania	Inactive	(Note: Chapter formed from Chi Alpha Sigma, established in 1970.)
Zeta Rho	1981–2018	Eastern Illinois University	Charleston, Illinois	Inactive	
**Zeta Sigma**	1982–1985, 1993	Texas A&M University	College Station, Texas	Active	
Zeta Tau	1984–2017	University of North Carolina Wilmington	Wilmington, North Carolina	Inactive	(Note: Chapter formed from Psi Kappa Omega, established in 1981. In November 2017, the fraternity suspended the chapter for multiple violations of the fraternity's risk management policy.)
Zeta Phi	1984–1995	Temple University	Philadelphia, Pennsylvania	Inactive	(Note: Chapter formed from Nu Delta, established in 1982.)
**Zeta Chi**	1986	University of Southern Mississippi	Hattiesburg, Mississippi	Active	
**Zeta Psi**	1986–1999, 2009	Stephen F. Austin State University	Nacogdoches, Texas	Active	
**Zeta Omega**	1987	Bradley University	Peoria, Illinois	Active	
Theta Alpha	1987–2001	University of Western Ontario	London, Ontario, Canada	Inactive	
Theta Beta	1988–1997	University of California, San Diego	San Diego, California	Inactive	
**Theta Gamma**	1989–2001, 2007	Arizona State University	Tempe, Arizona	Active	
**Theta Delta**	1989	Baylor University	Waco, Texas	Active	(Note: Chapter formed from Delta Tau, established in 1986.)
Theta Epsilon	1990–2020	American University	Washington, D.C.	Inactive	(Note: In 2020, all members of the chapter disaffiliated in protest of the cycle of violence and racism in fraternities.)
**Theta Zeta**	1990	University of San Diego	San Diego, California	Active	
**Theta Eta**	1992–1995, 1999–2014, 2019	University of South Carolina	Columbia, South Carolina	Active	(Note: In 2014, the chapter was closed by the fraternity's national leadership for multiple alcohol citations.)
Theta Theta	1993–2002	University of Ottawa	Ottawa, Ontario, Canada	Inactive	
Theta Iota	1993–1997	Towson University	Towson, Maryland	Inactive	(Note: Chapter formed from Sigma Pi Rho, established in 1985.)
**Theta Kappa**	1993–2013, 2020	University of Nebraska at Kearney	Kearney, Nebraska	Active	(Note: Chapter was closed due to low membership.)
**Theta Lambda**	1994	University of California, Riverside	Riverside, California	Active	
**Theta Mu**	November 11, 1994 – 2005; 2013 – October 22, 2020; January 25, 2025	Clemson University	Clemson, South Carolina	Active	(Note: Chapter formed from Delta Tau, established in 1992. In 2020, it was suspended for four years for hazing and underage drinking.)
Theta Nu	1995–2006	Southeastern Oklahoma State University	Durant, Oklahoma	Inactive	(Note: Chapter formed from Delta Chi Delta, established in 1989.)
**Theta Xi**	1996	Eastern Michigan University	Ypsilanti, Michigan	Active	
Theta Omicron	1996–2018	University of Northern Colorado	Greeley, Colorado	Inactive	
Theta Pi	1996–1998	Frostburg State University	Frostburg, Maryland	Inactive	(Note: Chapter formed from Omega Epsilon, established in 1993.)
Theta Rho	1997–2015	University of Dayton	Dayton, Ohio	Inactive	
Theta Sigma	1997–1999	University of California, Davis	Davis, California	Inactive	
**Theta Tau**	1997	Moravian University	Bethlehem, Pennsylvania	Active	
Theta Upsilon	1998–2002	Western Michigan University	Kalamazoo, Michigan	Inactive	
Theta Phi	1998–200x ?	Illinois State University	Normal, Illinois	Inactive	
**Theta Chi**	1999	Muhlenberg College	Allentown, Pennsylvania	Active	
Theta Psi	1999–2022	College of Idaho	Caldwell, Idaho	Inactive	
Theta Omega	2000–2016, 2022–2026	Northern Arizona University	Flagstaff, Arizona	Inactive	
Iota Alpha	2000–2012	DePaul University	Chicago, Illinois	Inactive	
**Iota Beta**	2000	Wittenberg University	Springfield, Ohio	Active	
Iota Gamma	2000–2019	Wright State University	Dayton, Ohio	Inactive	
Iota Delta	2000–2022	Quincy University	Quincy, Illinois	Inactive	
**Iota Epsilon**	2001	Chapman University	Orange, California	Active	
Iota Zeta	2002–2017; 2024-2025	Virginia Tech	Blacksburg, Virginia	Inactive	
Iota Eta	2003–2007	Belmont Abbey College	Belmont, North Carolina	Inactive	(Note: Chapter formed from Gamma Delta Chi, established in 1998.)
**Iota Theta**	2004	Kennesaw State University	Cobb County, Georgia	Active	
**Iota Iota**	2007	John Carroll University	University Heights, Ohio	Active	
**Iota Kappa**	2007	Appalachian State University	Boone, North Carolina	Active	
Iota Lambda	2009–2013	University of Tampa	Tampa, Florida	Inactive	
Iota Mu	2010–2022	Quinnipiac University	Hamden, Connecticut	Inactive	
**Iota Nu**	2010–2015, c. 2017	Florida Atlantic University	Boca Raton, Florida	Active	(Note: In 2015, Florida Atlantic University suspended the chapter for two years for "hazing brutality".)
**Iota Xi**	2010	Florida Institute of Technology	Melbourne, Florida	Active	
**Iota Omicron**	2010	Babson College	Wellesley, Massachusetts	Active	
**Iota Pi**	2011	University of Vermont	Burlington, Vermont	Active	(Note: The University of Vermont suspended the chapter after the alcohol-related death of one of its members in February 2019.)
Iota Rho	2012–2018	Pepperdine University	Los Angeles County, California	Inactive	(Note: In 2017, the Pepperdine University chapter was deactivated for an alcohol-related incident and other repeated violations.)
**Iota Sigma**	2012	North Dakota State University	Fargo, North Dakota	Active	
**Iota Tau**	2013	Sacred Heart University	Fairfield, Connecticut	Active	
**Iota Upsilon**	2013	Grand Valley State University	Allendale, Michigan	Active	
**Iota Phi**	2013	University of Wisconsin–Eau Claire	Eau Claire, Wisconsin	Active	
**Iota Chi**	2014	Lindenwood University	St. Charles, Missouri	Active	
**Iota Psi**	2014	Northeastern University	Boston, Massachusetts	Active	
**Iota Omega**	2014	University of Texas at Dallas	Richardson, Texas	Active	
**Kappa Beta**	2014	James Madison University	Harrisonburg, Virginia	Active	
Kappa Gamma	2015–2018	Monmouth University	West Long Branch, New Jersey	Inactive	(Note: The national fraternity closed the chapter due to low membership.)
Kappa Delta	2015 – January 19, 2018	California Polytechnic State University, San Luis Obispo	San Luis Obispo, California	Inactive	(Note: The national fraternity closed the chapter and removed members after accusations of multiple sexual assaults.)
**Kappa Epsilon**	March 5, 2016	The College of New Jersey	Ewing, New Jersey	Active	
**Kappa Zeta**	April 18, 2018	College of Charleston	Charleston, South Carolina	Active	
**Kappa Eta**	April 28, 2018	Mount St. Joseph University	Cincinnati, Ohio	Active	
**Kappa Theta**	October 9, 2021	University of Connecticut	Storrs, Connecticut	Active	
**Kappa Iota**	2022	East Carolina University	Greenville, North Carolina	Active	
**Kappa Kappa**	April 14, 2024	Florida International University	Miami, Florida	Active	
**Kappa Lambda**	April 21, 2024	Keene State College	Keene, New Hampshire	Active	
