= Brian D. Clark =

American politician

Member of the Pennsylvania House of Representatives from the 31st district
- In office 1979–1990
- Preceded by: Helen Gillette
- Succeeded by: Daniel L. Anderson

Personal details
- Born: June 12, 1956 (age 70) Natrona, Pennsylvania, United States
- Party: Democratic

Brian D. Clark (born June 12, 1956) is a former Democratic member of the Pennsylvania House of Representatives.
