= Steve Santarsiero =

American politician (born 1965)

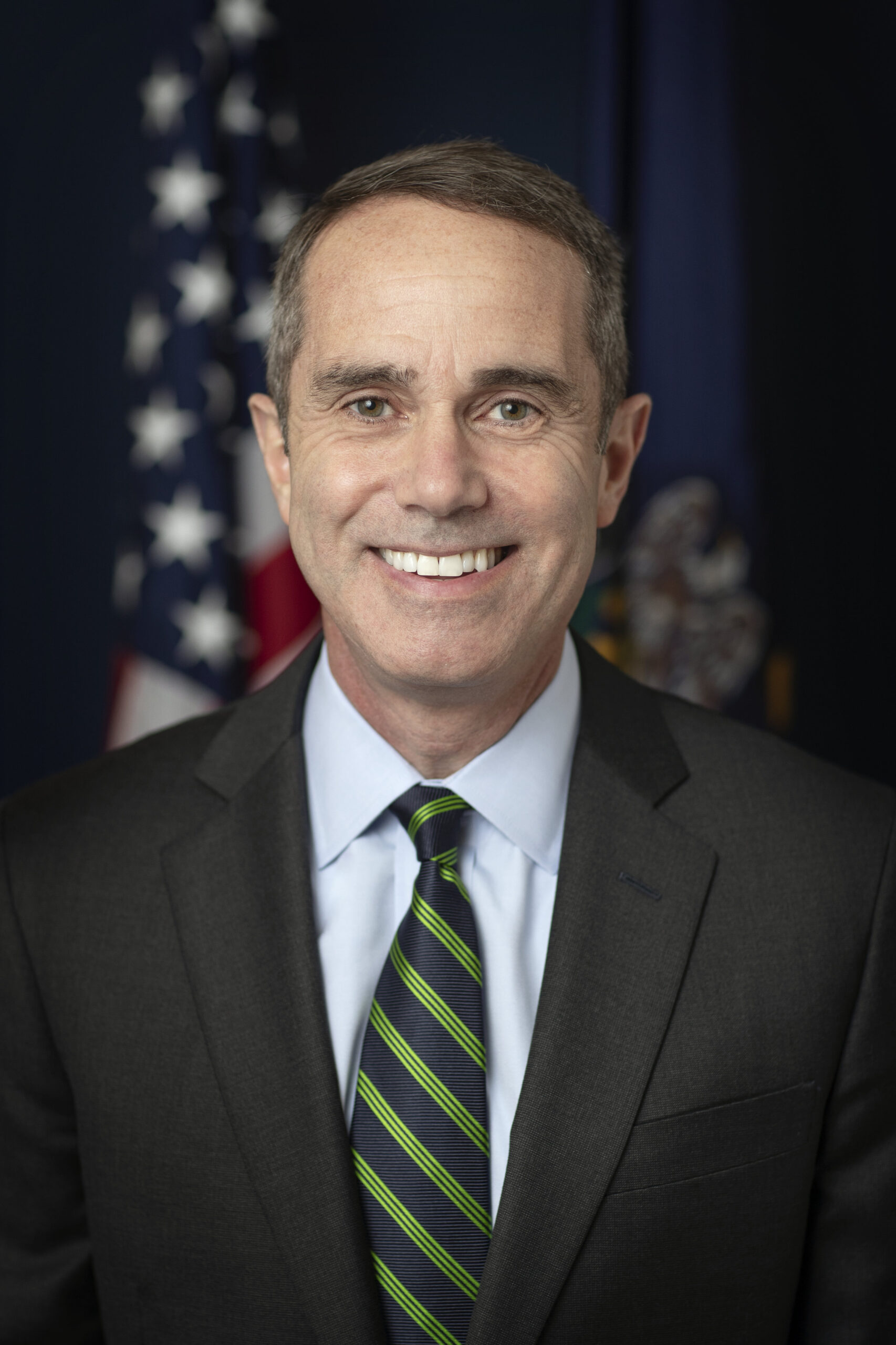

Member of the Pennsylvania Senate from the 10th district
- Incumbent
- Assumed office January 1, 2019
- Preceded by: Chuck McIlhinney

Member of the Pennsylvania House of Representatives from the 31st district
- In office January 6, 2009 – November 30, 2016
- Preceded by: David J. Steil
- Succeeded by: Perry Warren

Personal details
- Born: February 13, 1965 (age 61) Montclair, New Jersey, U.S.
- Party: Democratic
- Spouse: Ronni
- Children: 3
- Education: Tufts University (B.A.) University of Pennsylvania (J.D.) Holy Family University (M.Ed.)
- Website: www.senatorstevesantarsiero.com

Steven J. Santarsiero (born February 13, 1965) is an American attorney and politician. A member of the Democratic Party, he has represented the 10th District in the Pennsylvania State Senate since 2019. Santarsiero previously served in the Pennsylvania House of Representatives, representing the 31st District between 2009 and 2016.

== Early life and education ==
Santarsiero was born on February 13, 1965, in Montclair, New Jersey. He graduated from Verona High School in 1983. Santarsiero received his bachelor's degree from Tufts University in 1987. He went on to earn a J.D. from the University of Pennsylvania Law School in 1992. He received his M.Ed. from Holy Family University in 2006.

== Political career ==
After witnessing the 9/11 attacks, Santarsiero quit his law career and became a high school teacher to "give back more to the community." While a teacher at Bensalem High School, he encouraged his students to be active in their community.

In 2003, Santarsiero was elected to a seat on the Lower Makefield Township Board Supervisors, defeating a longtime incumbent while also becoming the first Democrat supervisor in 18 years. In 2004, Santarsiero organized the Southeastern Bucks League of Municipalities, a forum meant to deepen cooperation between 19 townships and boroughs in lower Bucks County, Pennsylvania.

Santarsiero was first elected to the Pennsylvania House of Representatives in 2008. Representing the 31st District, he was reelected in 2010, 2012, and 2014.

=== 2016 congressional election ===
In 2016, Santarsiero ran for Pennsylvania's open 8th Congressional District, following the retirement of Representative Mike Fitzpatrick. He faced fellow Democrat Shaughnessy Naughton in the primary election, whom he defeated. During the primary, Santarsiero was criticized after his campaign sent out mailers which claimed he "wrote PA’s Gun Safety Law." PolitiFact rated the claim as "False", given that Pennsylvania's standing gun law was passed in 1995, before Santarsiero was elected to the State House in 2008. Santarsiero's campaign manager later said the claim was a misstatement referring to a gun control bill which Santarsiero was the primary sponsor.

In the general election, Santarsiero faced Fitzpatrick's brother, Republican Brian Fitzpatrick. The race was labelled as the only competitive one in Pennsylvania, where both Republicans and Democrats were almost equally present within the district. Ultimately, Fitzpatrick won, 54%-46%.

=== State Senate ===
In 2018, Santarsiero defeated Republican state representative Marguerite Quinn for the open 10th District seat in the Pennsylvania State Senate. He was reelected in 2022, defeating challenger Matthew McCullough.

In April 2019, Santarsiero resigned from the law firm Curtin & Heefner. His resignation came after Curtin & Heefner took up the case of East Rockhill Township residents who opposed the reopening of the previously dormant Rockhill Quarry. An attorney for the quarry accused Santarsiero of a conflict of interest because his position as a state senator could allow him to access information on the quarry that may influence the outcome of the case. Santarsiero defended himself by saying he was a non-equity partner with the firm and had not been involved in the quarry case. Nonetheless, he resigned to "avoid so much as the appearance of any conflict."

For the 2025-2026 Session, Santarsiero serves as the Minority Caucus Secretary and sits on the following committees in the State Senate:

- State Government (Minority Chair)
- Consumer Protection & Professional Licensure
- Institutional Sustainability & Innovation
- Judiciary
- Rules & Executive Nominations

== Political positions ==
=== Campaign finance reform ===
Following the Citizens United Supreme Court Ruling, Santarsiero introduced a bill calling for a convention to amend the United States Constitution to allow states and the United States Congress to pass laws limiting the amount of money that any person or group can donate to federal or state elections. He reintroduced the resolution twice more in 2011 and 2013.

=== Environment ===
Following the passage of Act 13 of 2012, Santarsiero was one of six Democratic state representatives who authored the individual bills making up the "Marcellus Compact." Their bills sought to reestablish stronger taxation, stronger environmental protections, and local regulations on natural gas drilling rolled back by Act 13. Republicans threatened to prevent the bills from coming to a vote, which is what happened.

=== Gun policy ===
Following the Sandy Hook school shooting in 2013, Santarsiero introduced a bill in the State House which would mandate background checks for all gun sales. The bill was never put to vote. He reintroduced it in 2015 with similar results.

=== Israel ===
Santarsiero supports continued American support for Israel "as a long-standing ally and the only true democracy in a volatile region of the world" and "for the Jewish people . . . a homeland." He has twice introduced legislation that would punish Pennsylvania colleges for divesting from Israel, first in 2015 and again in 2024 following widespread college protests against Israel. The 2024 bill would withhold funds from colleges who take "actions that are intended to financially penalize the government of Israel or commercial financial activity in Israel." Santarsiero has previously stated that proponents of the BDS movement are "misinformed" and any comparisons of Israel to apartheid South Africa is "offensive."

=== LGBTQ issues ===
Santarsiero supports same-sex marriage. His youngest son came out as gay in 2021.

In 2020, Santarsiero introduced a resolution in the State Senate to recognize the day after Valentine's Day, February 15, as "Love is Love Day" in support of LGBTQ people. The resolution never made it to a vote.

In 2022, Santarsiero defended a "Queer Prom" hosted by a LGBTQ organization where he was present as a chaperone. The prom came under criticism from conservatives and conservative media after videos of drag performers at the event emerged, and attendees received swag bags which reportedly included condoms and lube. Santarsiero labeled the criticism as "distorted" and said he had been labelled a "pedophile" and "groomer" after the story was published on Fox News.

== Personal life ==
Santarsiero and his wife, Ronni Fuchs, reside in Lower Makefield Township, Pennsylvania. The couple have three children.
