= Pennsylvania House of Representatives, District 31 =

American legislative district

Pennsylvania's 31st State House of Representatives district
Representative
Perry Warren; D–Newtown, Bucks County
- Population (2022): 66,821

The 31st Pennsylvania House of Representatives District is in southeastern Pennsylvania and has been represented by Perry Warren since 2017.

== District profile ==
The 31st Pennsylvania House of Representatives District is located in Bucks County and includes the following areas:

- Lower Makefield Township
- Newtown
- Newtown Township
- Upper Makefield Township
- Yardley

== Representatives ==
Representative	Party	Years	District home	
Prior to 1969, seats were apportioned by county.
Helen D. Gillette	Democrat	1969 – 1978		
Brian D. Clark	Democrat	1979 – 1990		
Daniel L. Anderson	Republican	1991 – 1992		
District moved from Allegheny County to Bucks County after 1992
David J. Steil	Republican	1993 – 2008	Yardley	
Steve Santarsiero	Democrat	2009 – 2016	Lower Makefield Township	Retired from the state house to seek election to the United States House of Representatives
Perry Warren	Democrat	2017 – Present	Newtown	

== Recent election results ==
PA House election, 2024: Pennsylvania House, District 31
Party	Candidate	Votes	%
Democratic	Perry Warren (incumbent)	27,837	58.83
Republican	Bernie Sauer	19,477	41.17
Total votes		47,314	100.00
Democratic hold			

PA House election, 2022: Pennsylvania House, District 31
Party	Candidate	Votes	%
Democratic	Perry Warren (incumbent)	24,199	60.68
Republican	Bernie Sauer	15,680	39.32
Total votes		39,879	100.00
Democratic hold			

PA House election, 2020: Pennsylvania House, District 31
Party	Candidate	Votes	%
Democratic	Perry Warren (incumbent)	26,275	59.69
Republican	Charles Adcock	17,742	40.31
Total votes		44,017	100.00
Democratic hold			

PA House election, 2018: Pennsylvania House, District 31
Party	Candidate	Votes	%
Democratic	Perry Warren (incumbent)	20,583	59.96
Republican	Ryan Gallagher	13,745	40.04
Total votes		34,328	100.00
Democratic hold			

PA House election, 2016: Pennsylvania House, District 31
Party	Candidate	Votes	%
Democratic	Perry Warren	19,071	50.10
Republican	Ryan Gallagher	18,996	49.90
Total votes		38,067	100.00
Democratic hold			

PA House election, 2014: Pennsylvania House, District 31
Party	Candidate	Votes	%
Democratic	Steve Santarsiero (incumbent)	13,323	58.02
Republican	David Gibbon	9,639	41.98
Total votes		22,962	100.00
Democratic hold			

PA House election, 2012: Pennsylvania House, District 31
Party	Candidate	Votes	%
Democratic	Steve Santarsiero (incumbent)	20,640	57.74
Republican	Anne Chapman	15,105	42.26
Total votes		35,745	100.00
Democratic hold			

PA House election, 2010: Pennsylvania House, District 31
Party	Candidate	Votes	%
Democratic	Steve Santarsiero (incumbent)	13,482	50.30
Republican	Robert Ciervo	13,320	49.70
Total votes		26,802	100.00
Democratic hold			
