= Pennsylvania House of Representatives, District 30 =

American legislative district

Pennsylvania's 30th State House of Representatives district
Representative
Arvind Venkat; D–McCandless
- Population (2022): 63,488

The 30th Pennsylvania House of Representatives District is an electoral district in southwestern Pennsylvania that has been represented by Democrat Arvind Venkat since 2023.

== District profile ==
The 30th Pennsylvania House of Representatives District is located in Allegheny County and includes the following areas:

- Ben Avon
- Ben Avon Heights
- Emsworth
- Franklin Park
- Hampton Township (part)
  - District 03
  - District 04
  - District 05
  - District 12
  - District 13
- Kilbuck Township
- McCandless
- Ohio Township

== Representatives ==
Representative	Party	Years	District home	Note
Prior to 1969, seats were apportioned by county.
Lee A. Donaldson, Jr.	Republican	1969 – 1970		
Richard J. Cessar	Republican	1971 – 1994		
Jefferey Earl Habay	Republican	1995 – 2006		Resigned in April 2006
Shawn Flaherty	Democratic	2006		Elected on April 11, 2006 to fill vacancy
Randy Vulakovich	Republican	2007 – 2012	Shaler Township	Won Special Election for 40th Senate District
Hal English	Republican	2013 – 2018	Hampton Township	
Lori Mizgorski	Republican	2019 – 2022	Shaler Township	
Arvind Venkat	Democratic	2023 – present	McCandless	

== Recent election results ==
PA House election, 2024: Pennsylvania House, District 30
Party	Candidate	Votes	%
Democratic	Arvind Venkat (incumbent)	21,896	54.31
Republican	Nathan Wolfe	17,748	44.02
Libertarian	William Johnson Baierl	676	1.68
Total votes		40,320	100.00
Democratic hold			

PA House election, 2022: Pennsylvania House, District 30
Party	Candidate	Votes	%
Democratic	Arvind Venkat	18,757	55.34
Republican	Cynthia Kirk	15,136	44.66
Total votes		33,893	100.00
Democratic gain from Republican			

PA House election, 2020: Pennsylvania House, District 30
Party	Candidate	Votes	%
Republican	Lori Mizgorski (incumbent)	23,340	54.83
Democratic	Lissa Geiger Shulman	19,231	45.17
Total votes		42,571	100.00
Republican hold			

PA House election, 2018: Pennsylvania House, District 30
Party	Candidate	Votes	%
Republican	Lori Mizgorski	17,244	52.29
Democratic	Elizabeth Monroe	15,736	47.71
Total votes		32,980	100.00
Republican hold			

PA House election, 2016: Pennsylvania House, District 30
Party	Candidate	Votes	%
Republican	Hal English (incumbent)	Unopposed	
Total votes		35,575	100.00
Republican hold			

PA House election, 2014: Pennsylvania House, District 30
Party	Candidate	Votes	%
Republican	Hal English (incumbent)	Unopposed	
Total votes		18,390	100.00
Republican hold			

PA House election, 2012: Pennsylvania House, District 30
Party	Candidate	Votes	%
Republican	Hal English	19,945	56.67
Democratic	David Tusick	15,252	43.33
Total votes		35,197	100.00
Republican hold			

PA House election, 2010: Pennsylvania House, District 30
Party	Candidate	Votes	%
Republican	Randy Vulakovich (incumbent)	Unopposed	
Total votes		22,070	100.00
Republican hold			
