= Alpha Delta Sigma =

American advertising honor fraternity

- ΑΔΣ
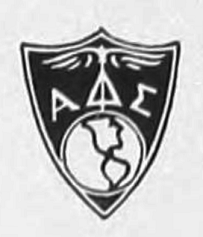
- Crest of Alpha Delta Sigma
- Founded: November 14, 1913; 112 years ago University of Missouri
- Type: Honor
- Affiliation: American Advertising Federation
- Former affiliation: PIC
- Status: Active
- Emphasis: Advertising
- Scope: National
- Motto: "Bridging the Gap"
- Colors: Red and White
- Chapters: 102 active
- Members: 70,000+ lifetime
- Headquarters: 1101 K Street NW, Suite 420; Washington, D.C. 20005; United States
- Website: Alpha Delta Sigma website

Alpha Delta Sigma (ΑΔΣ) is an American honor society for advertising. It started in 1913 as a men's professional fraternity and absorbed Gamma Alpha Chi women's professional fraternity in 1971. It merged into the American Advertising Federation in 1973, becoming an honor society at the time.

== History ==
Alpha Delta Sigma was formed as a men's professional fraternity for the field of advertising at the University of Missouri on November 14, 1913. Its founders were Alex C. Bayless, J. Harrison Brown, Oliver N. Gingrich, Howard W. Hailey, Alberg G. Hinman, Joseph B. Hosmer, John W. Jewell, Alfonso Johnson, Rex B. McGee, Hugh J. McKay, Thomas E. Parker, John B. Powell, D. D. Rosenfelder, Charles H. Ross, James E. Schofield, Robert K. Tindall, Guy B. Trail, Walter Williams, and Chauncey Wynne. Powell was an instructor in advertising and served as the fraternity's first president.

Alpha Delta Sigma was created for students who were interested in the business side of the newspaper business. It was affiliated with the Associated Advertising Clubs of the World, an earlier name for the American Advertising Federation. A second chapter was established at the University of Kentucky in early 1914. This was followed chapters at the University of Illinois Urbana-Champaign and the University of Washington in April 1914.

Alpha Delta Sigma was mostly inactive during World War I. Hosmer returned to the University of Missouri after the war and reestablished the fraternity. However, the fraternity failed to add new chapters because the field of advertising did not expand to many colleges and universities. This changed once the University of Missouri's program proved successful and a new chapter was added in 1920 at Georgetown College.

With the addition of this new chapter, the University of Missouri undertook a failed effort to become a national fraternity in 1920. This was successfully attempted in 1921, with founding member Gingrich serving as the first national president. A chapter was added at Dartmouth University in 1922, followed by a chapter at the University of Michigan in 1923.

To better organize its governing structure, Alpha Delta Sigma held its first national convention in Columbia, Missouri during the Journalism Week of 1926. Delegates from four chapters attended, with others sending their proxy by telegraph to write and approve a new constitution, expand the national officers, and update the fraternity's ritual. E. K. Johnston, an advertising professor at the University of Missouri, was selected as the second national president and served two terms.

Under Johnston's leadership, Alpha Delta Sigma positioned itself as a men's national professional advertising fraternity. It added five chapters in 1924, five in 1925, two in 1926, and three in 1927. In 1928, the fraternity had twenty active chapters. It was a charter member of the Professional Interfraternity Conference in 1928.

By 1961, the fraternity had chartered 69 collegiate chapters, with 53 active, and had initiated 17,000 members. Some chapters provided housing for members. Alpha Delta Sigma absorbed Gamma Alpha Chi, which had formed on February 9, 1920 at University of Missouri as a female counterpart to Alpha Delta Sigma and had 22 active chapters as of 1964. The merger occurred on November 2, 1971 in San Francisco.

The merged fraternity was headquartered, briefly, at Texas Tech University. In 1973, Alpha Delta Sigma merged into the American Advertising Federation. It became a national honor society for the advertising field.

== Symbols ==
At the time of its formation, the Greek letters ΑΔΣ were selected as the name ADS, short for advertising. Later, the name Alpha Delta Sigma represented the Greek words truth, persistence, and cooperation. The fraternity's motto is "Bridging the Gap".

Alpha Delta Sigma's colors are red and white. Its graduating members may wear honor cords that are red and white.

The Alpha Delta Sigma professional fraternity's badge was a shield with the image of the Western Hemisphere on a black background at the bottom, surmounted by the three Greek letters ΑΔΣ, and surrounded by a wreath, which differs from its lapel pin.

== Membership ==
Eligible for membership are juniors and seniors who have completed at least two upper level advertising classes, and have at least a 3.25 GPA.

== Members ==
- Kenneth G. Bartlett, New York State Assembly
- Neil H. Borden, professor of advertising at the Harvard Graduate School of Business Administration
- Berl Boyd, Kentucky House of Representatives
- Virgil Chapman, United States House of Representatives and United States Senate
- George C. Hanson, U.S. Consul General in Harbin, Moscow, and Salonika; U.S. Consul in Shantou, Chongqing, Fuzhou, and Harbin
- Paul C. Jones, United States House of Representatives and Missouri House of Representatives
- Laurence W. Lane Jr., United States Ambassador to Australia, and United States Ambassador to Nauru
- Larry R. Williams, investor and author

== See also ==
- Honor cords
- Professional fraternities and sororities

== Further information ==
- Donald G. Hileman and Billy I. Ross. Toward Professionalism in Advertising: The Story of Alpha Delta Sigma's Aid to Professionalize Advertising Through Advertising Education, 1913-1969. Alpha Delta Sigma, 1969.
