= Lindsey Williams =

American politician

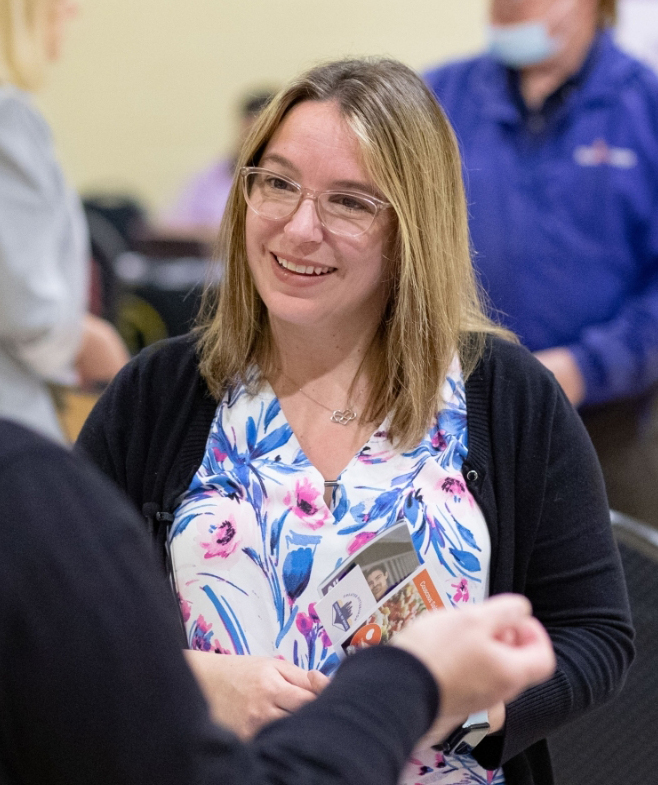

Member of the Pennsylvania Senate from the 38th district
- Incumbent
- Assumed office January 1, 2019
- Preceded by: Randy Vulakovich

Personal details
- Born: August 27, 1983 (age 43)
- Party: Democratic
- Education: Dickinson College (BA); Duquesne University School of Law (JD)
- Profession: Lawyer
- Website: Official website

Lindsey Marie Williams is an American politician. She is a Democratic member of the Pennsylvania State Senate, representing the 38th district.

== Education ==
Williams earned a BA in political science from Dickinson College and a JD from Duquesne University School of Law.

== Career ==
Williams worked as director of advocacy for the National Whistleblower Center, but was laid off in 2012 after attempting to unionize the small workforce. She was offered a severance package but rejected it because of a confidentiality clause that would have prevented her from discussing her experiences. She appealed to the National Labor Relations Board, and eventually settled the case with her former employer.

In 2014, Williams became communications director for the Pittsburgh Federation of Teachers. She also previously worked for the International Brotherhood of Teamsters.

=== Pennsylvania Senate ===
In 2018, Williams ran against Republican nominee Jeremy Shaffer in the general election, after Shaffer had defeated incumbent Randy Vulakovich in the Republican primary. The race was heavily watched, and Williams received an endorsement from former U.S. President Barack Obama. Both campaigns raised substantial amounts of funding—Williams raised over $700,000 and Shaffer raised over $1 million, including contributing $400,000 of his own money by the start of October and another $100,000 by the end of the month. Williams also campaigned and shared resources with other local female candidates, including Sara Innamorato. She narrowly defeated Shaffer (50.1% to 49.7%) in the election.

Weeks before the election, Republicans in the state claimed Williams did not meet the constitutional residency requirement and attempted to remove her name from the ballot. They contended that since she voted in Maryland in the 2014 general election, she had not been a resident of Pennsylvania for at least four years as required by the state constitution. However, the effort was rejected by a court. After she won the election, state Republicans renewed their opposition and challenged her ability to be seated in the legislature. After months of controversy, the Republican leadership in the Senate decided against preventing her inauguration based on the documents produced by Williams. She took the oath of office and was sworn in with other newly elected members on January 1, 2019.

On November 8, 2022, District 38 voters reelected Williams to her second four-year term. She prevailed over Republican candidate Lori Mizgorski by a vote of 70,854 (55.8%) to 56,139 (44.2%).

For the 2025-2026 Session, Williams sits on the following committees in the State Senate:

- Education (Minority Chair)
- Game & Fisheries
- Transportation
- Veterans Affairs & Emergency Preparedness
