= Rick Cessar =

American politician (1928–2022)

Richard J. Cessar

Member of the Pennsylvania House of Representatives from the 30th district
- In office January 5, 1971 – November 30, 1994
- Preceded by: Lee Donaldson
- Succeeded by: Jeff Habay

Republican Whip of the Pennsylvania House of Representatives
- In office January 6, 1981 – November 30, 1982
- Preceded by: Samuel Hayes
- Succeeded by: Samuel Hayes

Personal details
- Born: December 1, 1928 Etna, Pennsylvania, U.S.
- Died: October 11, 2022 (aged 93) McCandless, Pennsylvania, U.S.

Richard J. Cessar (December 1, 1928 – October 11, 2022) was an American Republican politician who was a member of the Pennsylvania House of Representatives.

Cessar died from heart failure in McCandless, Pennsylvania, on October 11, 2022, at the age of 93.
