= Lori Mizgorski =

American politician

Member of the Pennsylvania House of Representatives from the 30th district
- In office January 1, 2019 – November 30, 2022
- Preceded by: Hal English
- Succeeded by: Arvind Venkat

Shaler Township Supervisor
- In office 2009–2019

Personal details
- Born: Lori A. Voegtly; 1967 (age 58–59)
- Party: Republican
- Education: Hood College

Lori A. Mizgorski (née Voegtly; c. 1967–) is an American politician who previously represented the 30th Legislative District in the Pennsylvania House of Representatives. She now serves as District Manager for the district office of the 44th District of the Pennsylvania House of Representatives She is a Republican.

== Early life and education ==
Mizgorski is a native of Shaler Township. She graduated from Shaler Area High School in 1985, and studied English at Hood College.

== Political career ==
Lori Mizgorski ran for a seat on the Shaler Township board of commissioners in 2005, missing it in a 562–584 vote. She was elected in 2009, and from January 2011, concurrently served as Shaler Township representative to the Allegheny River Towns Enterprise Zone. Mizgorski began working for Hal English in 2013, when English was elected to the Pennsylvania House of Representatives from District 30. In November of that year, Mizgorski secured a second term as township commissioner. In July 2018, she was nominated by the Republican Party to replace English on the ballot, after English chose not to run for reelection. Mizgorski defeated Democratic Party candidate Betsy Monroe in the general election. To take office as a state legislator, Mizgorski was required to resign her township board position, in which she was replaced by her husband David. In April 2019, Mizgorski was appointed to the board of directors of the Port Authority of Allegheny County, by Mike Turzai, succeeding Robert Vescio. Mizgorski faced Democratic Party candidate Lissa Geiger Shulman in the 2020 general election and was elected to a second term.

=== Committee assignments ===
- Labor & Industry
- Local Government
- Transportation
- Urban Affairs, Subcommittee on Cities, Counties - Second Class - Chair
