= East Norwegian Township, Pennsylvania =

Township in Pennsylvania, US

Coordinates: 40°42′30″N 76°09′59″W

- Township
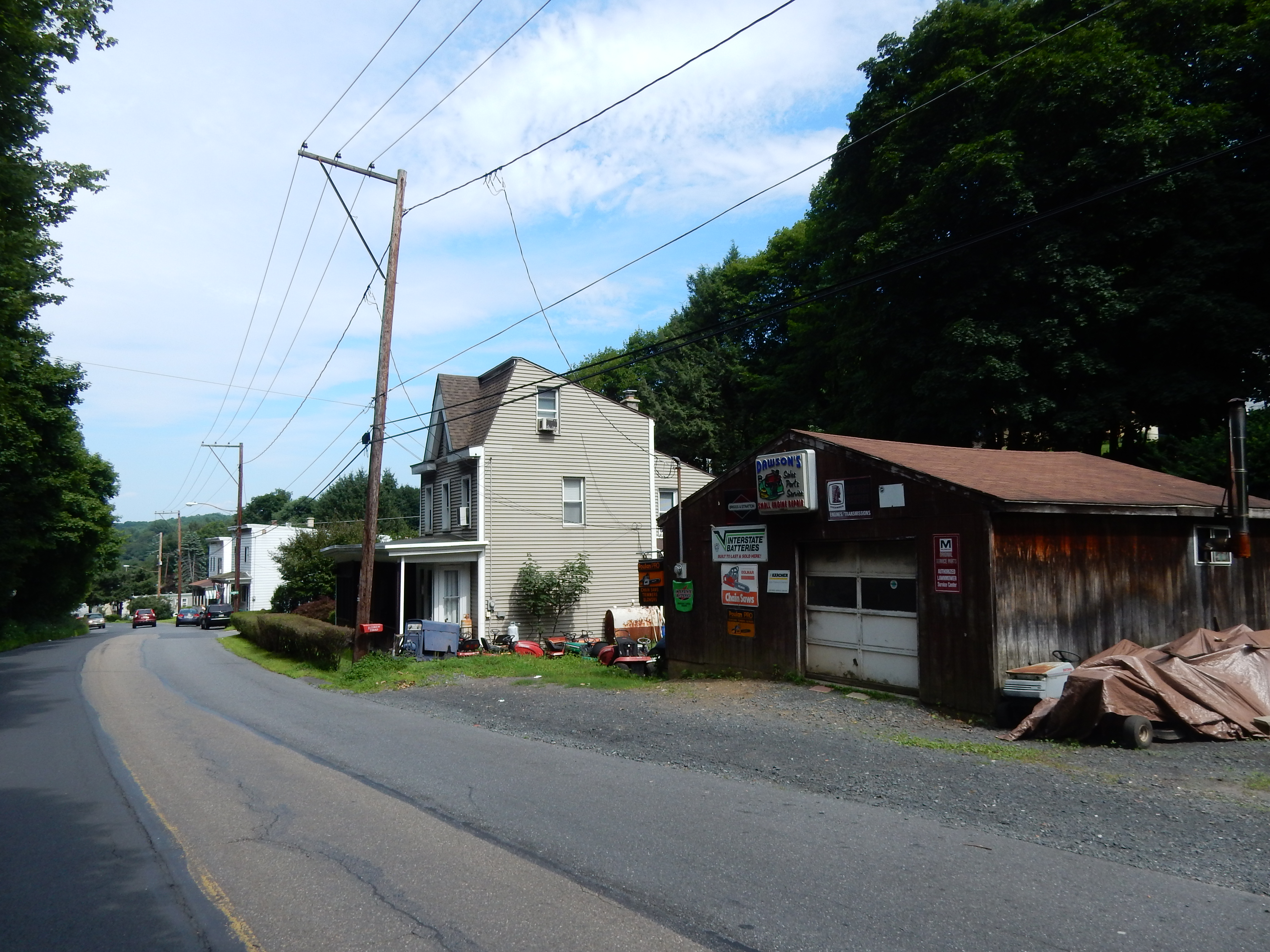
- Mill Creek Avenue in East Norwegian Twp.

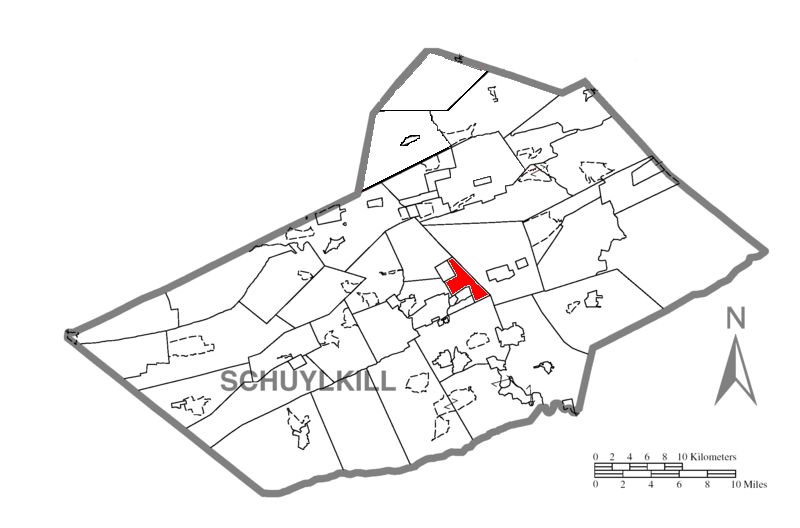
- Map of Schuylkill County, Pennsylvania Highlighting East Norwegian Township

- Map of Schuylkill County, Pennsylvania
- Country: United States
- State: Pennsylvania
- County: Schuylkill
- Incorporated: 1811

Area
  - Total: 4.07 sq mi (10.55 km^{2})
  - Land: 4.07 sq mi (10.55 km^{2})
  - Water: 0 sq mi (0.00 km^{2})

Population (2020)
  - Total: 861 ▲
  - Estimate (2023): 865
  - Density: 203.2/sq mi (78.45/km^{2})
- Time zone: UTC-5 (Eastern (EST))
  - Summer (DST): UTC-4 (EDT)
- FIPS code: 42-107-21616
- Website: www.eastnorwegiantwp.org

East Norwegian Township is a township in Schuylkill County, Pennsylvania, United States. The population was 861 at the 2020 census.

== Geography ==
According to the United States Census Bureau, the township has a total area of 4.1 square miles (11 km^{2}), all land.

== Demographics ==
Historical population
Census	Pop.	Note	%±
2010	863		—
2020	861		−0.2%
2023 (est.)	865		0.5%
U.S. Decennial Census

At the 2000 census there were 864 people, 366 households, and 243 families in the township. The population density was 212.4 inhabitants per square mile (82.0/km^{2}). There were 383 housing units at an average density of 94.1 per square mile (36.3/km^{2}). The racial makeup of the township was 99.19% White, 0.35% African American, 0.23% from other races, and 0.23% from two or more races. Hispanic or Latino of any race were 0.23%.

Of the 366 households 24.3% had children under the age of 18 living with them, 54.9% were married couples living together, 6.3% had a female householder with no husband present, and 33.6% were non-families. 29.8% of households were one person and 18.9% were one person aged 65 or older. The average household size was 2.36 and the average family size was 2.92.

The age distribution was 18.1% under the age of 18, 8.1% from 18 to 24, 23.8% from 25 to 44, 28.4% from 45 to 64, and 21.6% 65 or older. The median age was 45 years. For every 100 females, there were 95.5 males. For every 100 females age 18 and over, there were 90.8 males.

The median household income was $37,100 and the median family income was $41,875. Males had a median income of $30,417 versus $23,125 for females. The per capita income for the township was $20,555. About 3.1% of families and 4.7% of the population were below the poverty line, including 3.1% of those under age 18 and 10.7% of those age 65 or over.
