= American Advertising Federation =

U.S. trade association

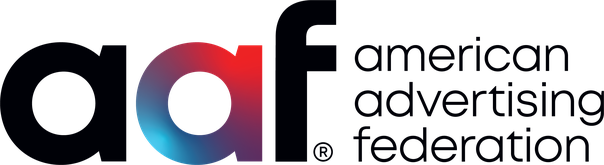
- Formation: February 16, 1973 (53 years ago)
- Type: Nonprofit organization
- Location: Washington, D.C., U.S.
- Website: www.aaf.org

The American Advertising Federation (AAF) is the nation's oldest national advertising industry trade association. It is headquartered in Washington, D.C. AAF has 15 district operations, each located in and representing a different region of the nation.

== Organization ==
Logo of the American Advertising Federation until 2021

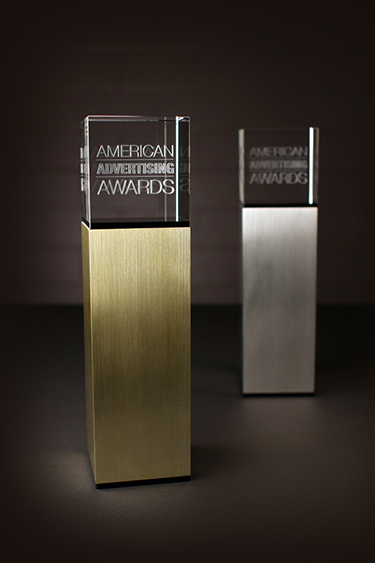
Gold and Silver National ADDY Awards

AAF's members are nearly 100 corporate members which are advertisers, advertising agencies, and media companies; a national network of nearly 200 local federations, representing 40,000 advertising professionals, located across the country; and more than 200 AAF college chapters, with over 6,500 student members.

=== Advertising Hall of Fame ===
AAF operates programs and initiatives, including the Advertising Hall of Fame, formerly known as the ADDY Awards, the National Student Advertising Competition, the Mosaic Center on Multiculturalism, and summer Ad Camps for high school students in Chicago and Washington, D.C. They are one of the U.S. advertising industry's largest competitions and is unique in its three-tier structure. The competition attracts more than 35,000 professional and student entries each year through local American Advertising Federation Club (Ad Club) competitions.

The mission of the American Advertising Awards competition is to recognize and reward the nation's finest creative advertising. the American Advertising Awards,

Entrants begin at the local level through more than 140 local AAF affiliate chapters in competitions usually held in January and February. Local ADDY Award winners are then eligible to advance to one of 15 regional AAF District competitions. Winners at the District level are then entered in the National competition, and National ADDY Award winners are recognized at ADMERICA, the AAF's national conference held each June.

The awards are sponsored by Ad 2, a division of the AAF focused on young adults.

The AAF and its local and district affiliates use the proceeds to enhance advertising through programs such as public service, internships, advocacy groups, advertising education, and consumer awareness.

A Gold ADDY Award is recognition of the highest level of creative excellence in that tier of competition. Entries that are also considered outstanding and worthy of recognition receive a Silver ADDY Award.

== See also ==
- American Advertising Federation Hall of Fame
- List of advertising awards
