= Twilight (1864 towboat) =

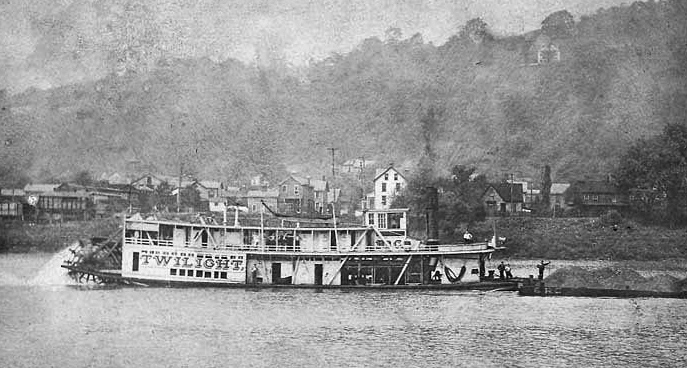
- Twilight at West Elizabeth, Pennsylvania, in 1912

History

United States
- Name: Twilight
- Launched: 1864
- Renamed: 1882, from "Traveler"
- Fate: Sunk January 17, 1921

The Twilight was an American sternwheeler towboat that was built in 1864 in Middletown, Pennsylvania. Initially named as the Traveler, she was rebuilt in 1882 by Lew Clark and renamed as the Twilight. She was then renamed again in May 1927 as the J. H. McCrady.

This sternwheeler was also nicknamed "The Cat with Nine Lives" because she was involved in so many accidents.

== Incidents and activities ==
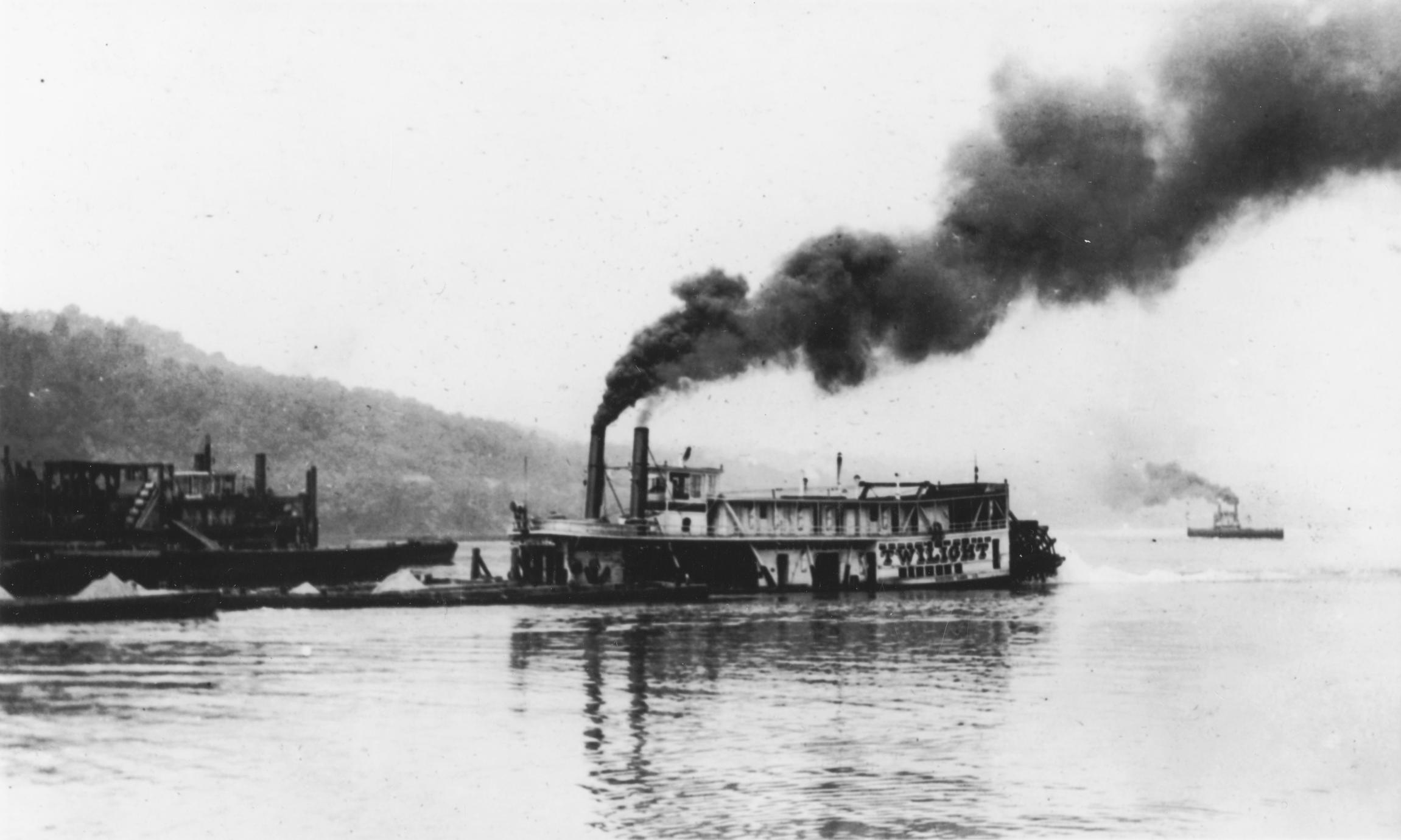
Twilight with a tow

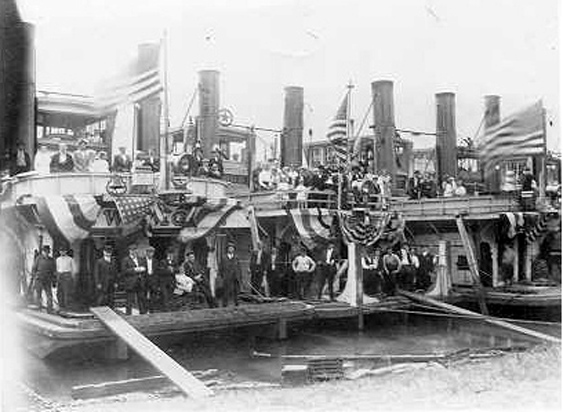
Steamers Twilight, Carbon, and Cadet at the Pittsburgh parade. Capt. Tom Lewis at the head of Twilight with his hands folded

- May 13, 1891 – Burned with two other vessels at the base of Ferry Street in Pittsburgh
- April 1898 – Sunk after striking the 43rd Street bridge in Pittsburgh, pushing its hog chain braces through the hull
- September 1902 – Involved in a collision with the I. C. Woodward in Fayette County, Pennsylvania, sinking that vessel
- December 3, 1905 – Sunk after running over Lock 2 of the Monongahela River during a flood
- February 1909 – Engineer James A. Hornbake drowned near Duquesne, Pennsylvania
- September 27, 1913 – Twilight took part in a parade celebrating Allegheny County, Pennsylvania's 125th anniversary. The parade consisted of 30 steamboats which sailed from Monongahela Wharf down the Ohio to the Davis Island Dam. The boats in line were the parade flagship Steel City (formerly the Pittsburgh and Cincinnati packet Virginia), City of Parkersburg, Charles Brown, Alice Brown, Exporter, Sam Brown, Boaz, Raymond Horner, Swan, Sunshine, I. C. Woodward, Cruiser, Volunteer, A. R. Budd, J. C. Risher, Clyde, Rival, Voyager, Jim Brown, Rover, Charlie Clarke, Robt. J. Jenkins, Slipper, Bertha, Midland, Sam Barnum, Cadet, Carbon, Twilight, and Troubadour.
- October 7, 1917 – Sunk near Braddock, Pennsylvania, after nosing into the water while traveling at full speed
- 1918 – Accidentally destroyed the 16th Street Bridge (Mechanics Bridge) when sparks from its funnels set the wooden structure on fire
- November 15, 1920 – Caught fire and was severely damaged near Pittsburgh
- January 17, 1921 – Sunk near 31st Street in Pittsburgh
