= West Deer Township, Pennsylvania =

Township in Pennsylvania, US

Coordinates: 40°37′42″N 79°52′01″W

West Deer Township
- Township
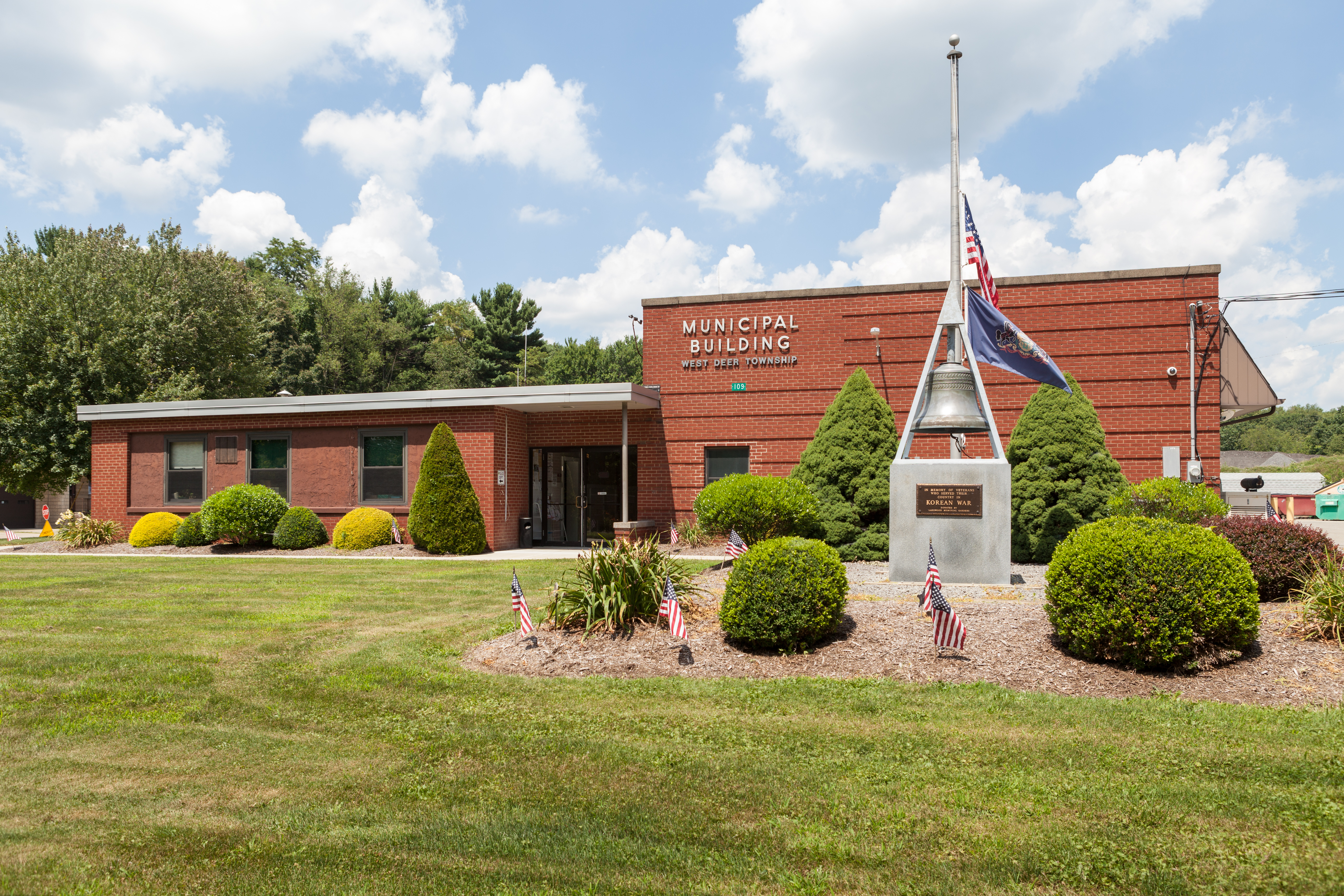
- Municipal Building

- Logo

- Location in Allegheny County and state of Pennsylvania

- Location of Pennsylvania in the United States
- Country: United States
- State: Pennsylvania
- County: Allegheny

Area
  - Total: 28.87 sq mi (74.78 km^{2})
  - Land: 28.87 sq mi (74.77 km^{2})
  - Water: 0.0039 sq mi (0.01 km^{2})

Population (2020)
  - Total: 12,262
  - Density: 412.3/sq mi (159.18/km^{2})
- Time zone: UTC-5 (EST)
  - Summer (DST): UTC-4 (EDT)
- FIPS code: 42-003-82800

West Deer Township is a township in Allegheny County, Pennsylvania, Pennsylvania, United States. The population was 12,262 at the 2020 census.

== History ==
In 1788, the Pennsylvania Legislature created Allegheny County from some of Westmoreland and Washington counties and most of the Depreciation Lands north of the Ohio River and west of the Allegheny River. The county was expanded a year later. Of the county's then seven townships, Pitt Township comprised most of the northern part of the county. It is this township that would be divided in 1796 to form Pine and Deer townships. Deer Township was made up of what is today the eastern parts of Richland and West Deer, Frazer, most of East Deer, part of Hampton, and all of Fawn and Harrison. Deer gets its name from Chief Deer, a sub-chief of Iroquois leader Guyasuta. Half of Deer Township was used to create Indiana Township in 1805. In 1836, upon petition of its citizens, Deer was divided into East Deer and West Deer. In 1860, the western boundary of West Deer was moved eastward, the land being used to form Richland Township. In 1861, part of the southwestern corner of West Deer was used to form Hampton Township. West Deer also annexed land along its southern border from Indiana Township in this exchange. Historically, much of West Deer's economy has been based on farming and coal mining. Many coal towns such as Curtisville, Bairdford, and Russellton were dominant forces in the industry. In recent years, significant suburban growth has occurred in the southwestern and central portions of the township, while other portions have remained rural.

== Geography ==
According to the United States Census Bureau, the township has a total area of 29.0 square miles (75.1 km^{2}), all land.

=== Streams ===
Deer Creek flows through the township.

The township contains the following communities: Allegheny Acres, Allison Park, Bairdford, Benjamin, Blanchard, Culmerville, Curtisville, Fawn Haven, Magill Heights, Red Hot, and Russellton.

== Demographics ==
Historical population
Census	Pop.	Note	%±
1850	1,716		—
1860	1,865		8.7%
1870	1,299		−30.3%
1880	1,438		10.7%
1890	1,301		−9.5%
1900	1,225		−5.8%
1910	2,206		80.1%
1920	5,290		139.8%
1930	6,461		22.1%
1940	7,815		21.0%
1950	7,484		−4.2%
1960	9,038		20.8%
1970	10,074		11.5%
1980	10,897		8.2%
1990	11,371		4.3%
2000	11,563		1.7%
2010	11,771		1.8%
2020	12,262		4.2%

As of the 2000 census, there were 11,563 people, 4,378 households, and 3,349 families residing in the township. The population density was 399.0 inhabitants per square mile (154.1/km^{2}). There were 4,584 housing units at an average density of 158.2 per square mile (61.1/km^{2}). The racial makeup of the township was 98.94% White, 0.29% African American, 0.11% Native American, 0.22% Asian, 0.10% from other races, and 0.35% from two or more races. Hispanic or Latino of any race were 0.42% of the population.

There were 4,378 households, out of which 35.0% had children under the age of 18 living with them, 64.3% were married couples living together, 8.7% had a female householder with no husband present, and 23.5% were non-families. 20.4% of all households were made up of individuals, and 9.5% had someone living alone who was 65 years of age or older. The average household size was 2.62 and the average family size was 3.04.

In the township the population was spread out, with 25.0% under the age of 18, 5.7% from 18 to 24, 31.3% from 25 to 44, 23.8% from 45 to 64, and 14.2% who were 65 years of age or older. The median age was 39 years. For every 100 females, there were 95.3 males. For every 100 females age 18 and over, there were 93.1 males.

The median income for a household in the township was $46,370, and the median income for a family was $52,295. Males had a median income of $40,824 versus $26,032 for females. The per capita income for the township was $20,358. About 4.5% of families and 6.3% of the population were below the poverty line, including 7.6% of those under age 18 and 6.6% of those age 65 or over.

== Government and politics ==
Presidential election results
Year	Republican	Democratic	Third parties
2020	60% 4,545	38% 2,915	1% 77
2016	62% 3,712	37% 2,176	1% 57
2012	60% 3,362	39% 2,194	1% 68
