= Hampton Township, Allegheny County, Pennsylvania =

Township in Pennsylvania, US

Hampton Township, Pennsylvania
- Township
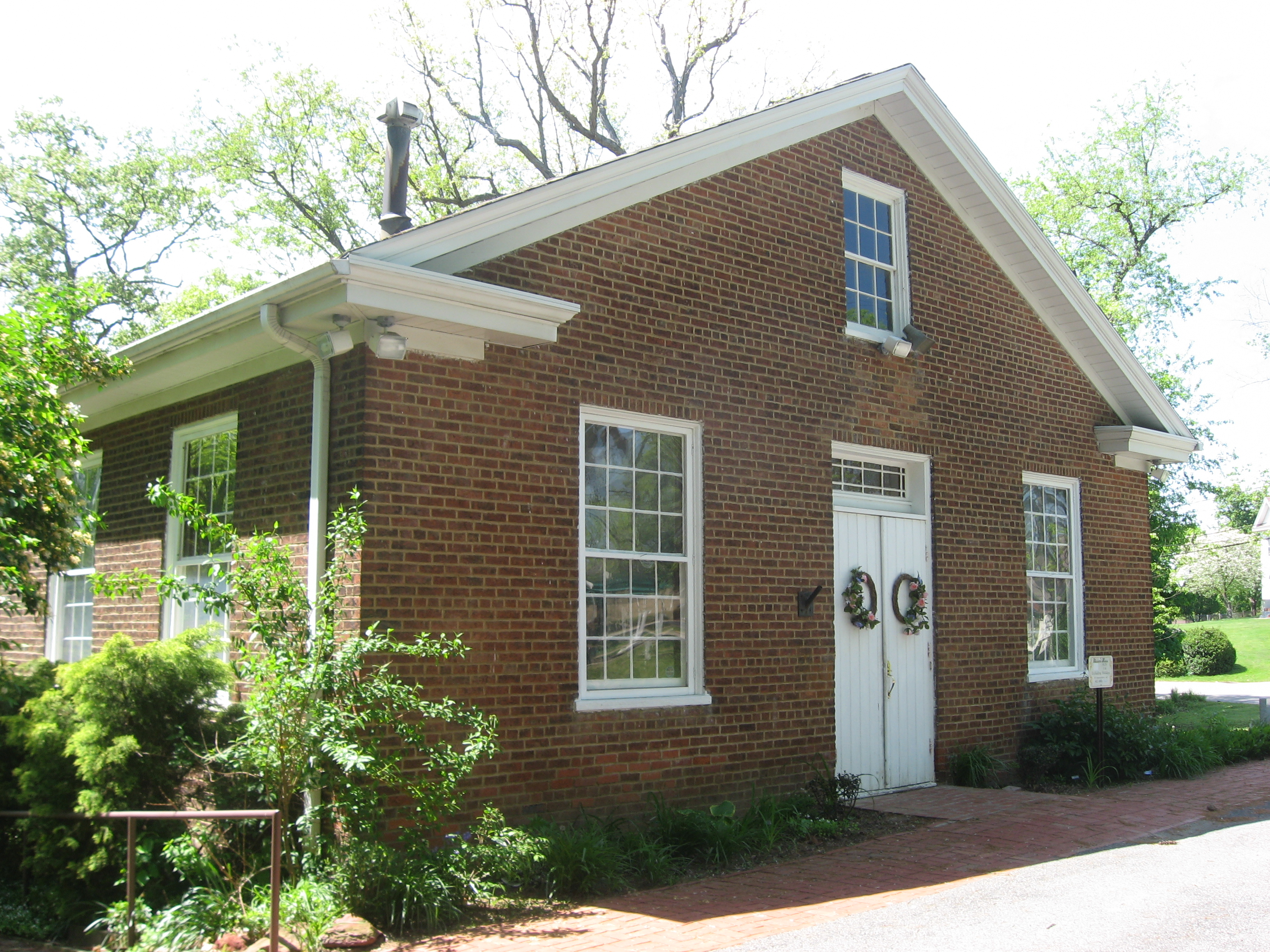
- Depreciation Lands Museum

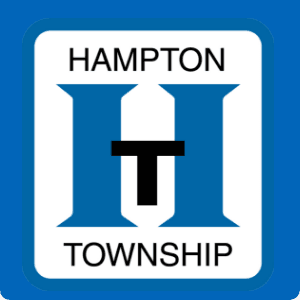
- Logo

- Location in Allegheny County and state of Pennsylvania
- Coordinates: 40°31′35″N 80°1′19″W
- Country: United States
- State: Pennsylvania
- County: Allegheny

Government
  - Type: Council
  - Council President: Carolynn Johnson (D)

Population (2022)
  - Total: 18,125
- Time zone: UTC-5 (Eastern (EST))
  - Summer (DST): UTC-4 (EDT)
- Area code: 412

Hampton Township is a township in Allegheny County, Pennsylvania, United States. The population was 18,470 at the 2020 census. It is a suburb of the Pittsburgh metropolitan area.

== History ==
The first settlers of present-day Hampton Township in northern Allegheny County arrived in the mid- to late 18th century around the time of the Revolutionary War. The town was called Tally Cavey. Hunters and fur trappers moved north of the Allegheny River in search of better game in the forests and more animals to capture and trade fur. In 1794, John McCaslin obtained a large section of land presently known as Oak Hill Farms near the junction of Route 8 and Mt. Royal Boulevard. Many geographical landmarks in the area bear the names of early settlers such as Robert and James Sample, William and Henry McCully, and John McNeal.

In 1861, Moses Hampton, LLD, a judge and member of Congress, signed the documents necessary to make Hampton into a municipality comprising parts of McCandless, Indiana, and West Deer townships. Throughout the late 19th to the 20th century, people slowly began to move into this area, eventually creating a bustling community of over 18,000 people.

== Geography ==
Hampton Township is located at 40°34′59″N 79°57′23″W (40.583096, -79.956583).

According to the United States Census Bureau, the township has a total area of 16.0 square miles (41 km^{2}), of which 0.06% is water.

=== Communities ===
- Allison Park
- Elfinwild
- Hardy
- Pheasant Creek
- Sample
- Sutter Heights
- Talley Cavey
- Wildwood
- Wyndham Gulch
- Gibsonia

=== Surrounding neighborhoods ===
Hampton Township has five borders, including Richland Township to the north, West Deer Township to the northeast, Indiana Township to the east and southeast, Shaler Township to the south and McCandless to the west.

== Demographics ==
Historical population
Census	Pop.	Note	%±
1870	938		—
1880	1,003		6.9%
1890	1,324		32.0%
1900	1,513		14.3%
1910	1,641		8.5%
1920	1,720		4.8%
1930	3,333		93.8%
1940	3,364		0.9%
1950	6,104		81.5%
1960	10,641		74.3%
1970	12,515		17.6%
1980	14,319		14.4%
1990	15,568		8.7%
2000	17,526		12.6%
2010	18,363		4.8%
2020	18,470		0.6%
2022 (est.)	18,125		−1.9%

At the 2000 census there were 17,526 people, 6,253 households, and 4,896 families living in the township. The population density was 1,092.8 inhabitants per square mile (421.9/km^{2}). There were 6,627 housing units at an average density of 413.2 per square mile (159.5/km^{2}). The racial makeup of the township was 97.66% White, 0.67% African American, 0.05% Native American, 1.23% Asian, 0.01% Pacific Islander, 0.12% from other races, and 0.27% from two or more races. 0.53% of the population were Hispanic or Latino of any race. There were 6,253 households, 38.5% had children under the age of 18 living with them, 68.8% were married couples living together, 7.1% had a female householder with no husband present, and 21.7% were non-families. 18.8% of households were made up of individuals, and 7.3% were one person aged 65 or older. The average household size was 2.76 and the average family size was 3.18.

The age distribution was 28.1% under the age of 18, 4.9% from 18 to 24, 27.6% from 25 to 44, 26.3% from 45 to 64, and 13.1% 65 or older. The median age was 40 years. For every 100 females there were 95.7 males. For every 100 females age 18 and over, there were 91.9 males.

The median household income was in the township was $80,911. The per capita income for the township was $41,074. About 0.2% of families and 1.6% of the population were below the poverty line, including 2.5% of those under age 18 and 6.7% of those age 65 or over.

== Government and politics ==
Presidential election results
Year	Republican	Democratic	Third parties
2020	52% 6,342	47% 5,746	1% 126
2016	54% 5,783	42% 4,566	4% 399
2012	60% 6,252	39% 4,018	1% 96

Hampton Township is governed by a five-member township council and an elected controller.

Current elected officials:

- Carolynn Johnson, President
- Bethany Blackburn, Vice President
- Julie Fritsch
- Alfred Midgley
- Dan Sciulli
- Jerry Speakman, Controller

Breakdown by party and term

- [2026-2029] Democrats-3 (Johnson, Blackburn, Fritsch), [2024-2027] Republicans-3 (Midgley, Sciulli, Speakman)

== Education ==
The five public schools (K-12) in the area are managed by the Hampton Township School District.

Elementary (K-5): Wyland Elementary School, Central Elementary School, Poff Elementary School

Middle (6–8): Hampton Middle School

High (9–12): Hampton High School

Aquinas Academy of Pittsburgh is also located in Hampton Township. It is a private, Catholic school serving pre-K through grade 12.
