= Collins Township, Allegheny County, Pennsylvania =

Collins Township
- Former Township
- Location within the state of Pennsylvania
- Coordinates: 40.47°N 79.92°W
- Country: United States
- State: Pennsylvania
- County: Allegheny
- Established: 1850
- Dissolved: June 30, 1868
- Named for: Thomas Collins
- Time zone: UTC-5 (Eastern (EST))
  - Summer (DST): UTC-4 (EDT)

Collins Township was a township in Allegheny County, Pennsylvania, in the northeast part of what is now Pittsburgh. It included most of the present city east of Lawrenceville, north of Penn Avenue, and south of the Allegheny River. It was formed in 1850 from a northern portion of Peebles Township and was named for Thomas Collins, a prominent lawyer. On June 30, 1868, Collins Township along with the borough of Lawrenceville and the townships of Pitt, Oakland, Liberty, and Peebles were incorporated into Pittsburgh. The former Collins Township became wards 18, 19, and 21 of the expanded city.
