= I. C. Woodward =

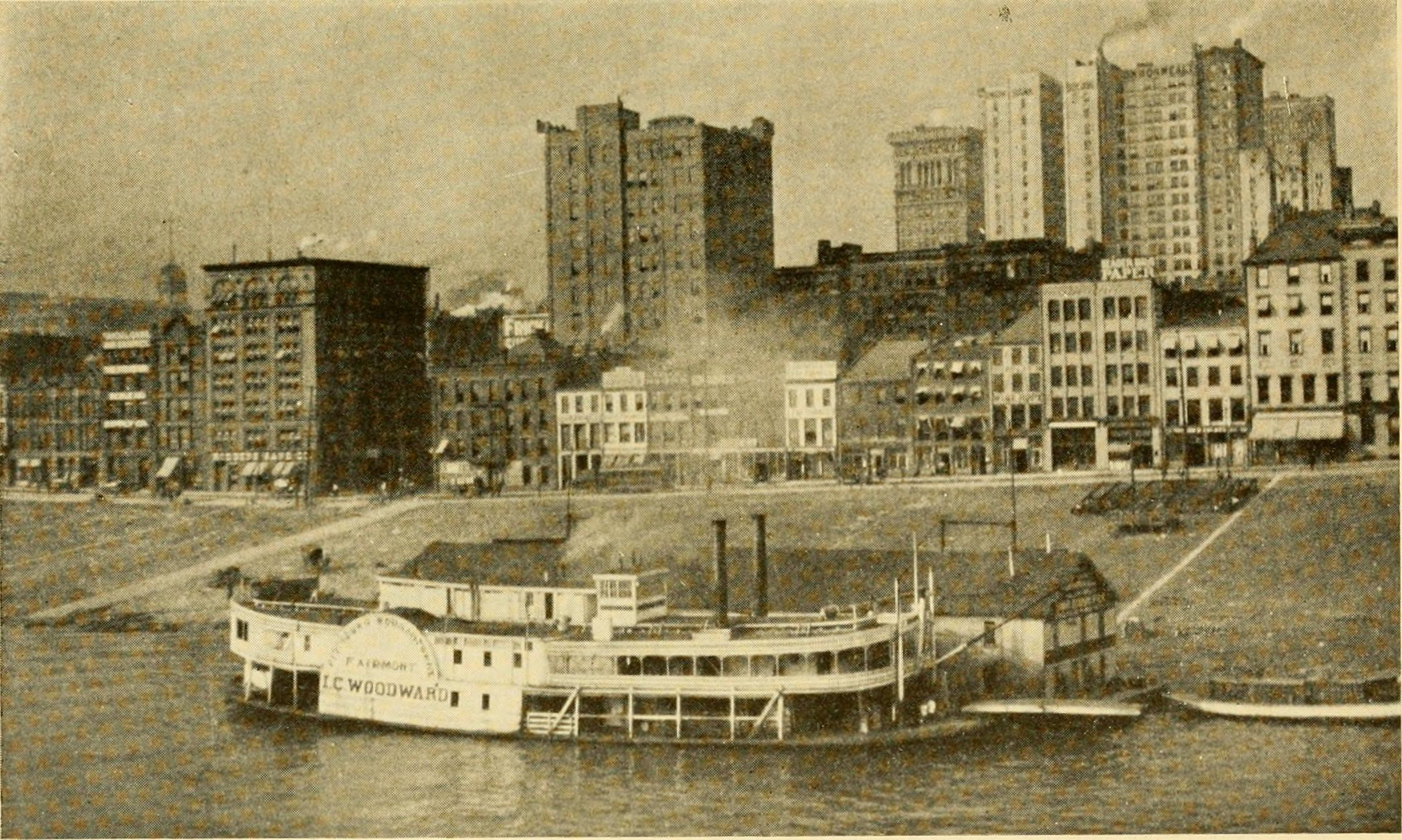
I. C. Woodward on Monongahela Wharf, 1913

I. C. Woodward was a side-wheel packet boat launched in July 1898 by Andrew Axton & Son Co. of West Brownsville, Pennsylvania, for the Pittsburgh, Brownsville and Geneva Packet Company. She was named for ship captain Isaac C. Woodward. I. C. Woodward was 164 ft (50 m) long by 42 ft (13 m) wide with a 5 ft (1.5 m) draft. She had 50 staterooms with additional passenger room in her texas.

I. C. Woodward ran the Monongahela River twice weekly between Pittsburgh, Pennsylvania, and Morgantown, West Virginia, between 1898 and 1911. She is known to have traveled farther south to Fairmont, West Virginia, once in 1912 and again in October 1913.

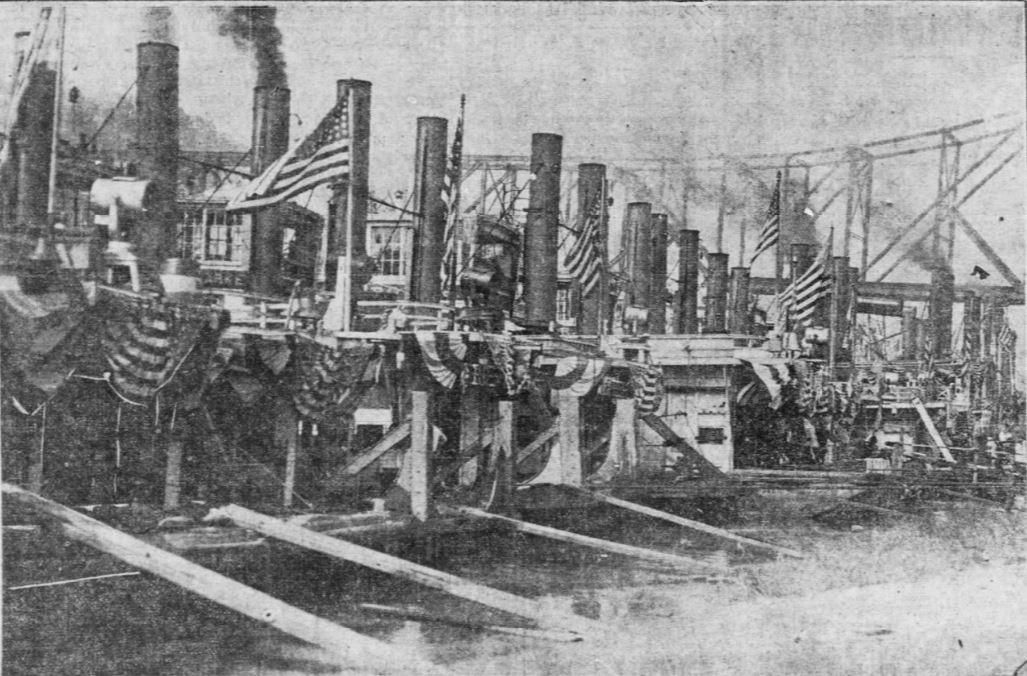
Bows of the decorated marine craft moored to the Pittsburgh Wharf just before the start of the grand water pageant

On 27 September 1913 she took part in a parade celebrating Allegheny County, Pennsylvania's 125th anniversary. The parade consisted of 30 steamboats which sailed from Monongahela Wharf down the Ohio to the Davis Island Dam. The boats in line were the parade flagship Steel City (formerly the Pittsburgh and Cincinnati packet Virginia), City of Parkersburg, Charles Brown, Alice Brown, Exporter, Sam Brown, Boaz, Raymond Horner, Swan, Sunshine, I. C. Woodward, Cruiser, Volunteer, A. R. Budd, J. C. Risher, Clyde, Rival, Voyager, Jim Brown, Rover, Charlie Clarke, Robt. J. Jenkins, Slipper, Bertha, Midland, Sam Barnum, Cadet, Twilight, and Troubadour.

She was removed from service in 1913, sold to a group in either New Albany or Evansville, Indiana, and was converted into an excursion steamer named Virginia.

In January 1915 (as I. C. Woodward) she was bought for $10,000 by an Evansville man, who wished to use her for the summer excursion business on the Ohio River, where she would be in opposition to the John S. Hopkins, which ran between Evansville and Henderson, Kentucky, every Sunday. There were also plans for occasional river excursions in and out of Owensboro, Kentucky. The steamer was in need of $9,000 worth of repair which were scheduled to be undertaken in Evansville starting that same month.

She was purchased by a group from Charleston, West Virginia, and operated as City of Charleston from 1919 to 1921.

On 21 May 1921 she was laid up in Gallipolis, Ohio, for new boilers before resuming duties on the Monongahela River when she caught fire and was destroyed along with a pumpboat owned by the Hickey Transportation Company of Cincinnati, which was tied up alongside her. The total loss of the Charleston was posted as $40,000.

== Incidents ==
In August 1902, I. C. Woodward, captained by S. S. Brown, raced the steamship Elizabeth, piloted by Sam Hendrickson and Irwin Boyd, down the Monongahela River to Lock 9. The boats finished in a dead heat, jamming the entrance to the lock. Both ships refused to yield, blocking entry to all others. Finally, I. C. Woodward's owner ordered Captain Brown to stand down and move Woodward aside.

In September 1902, she sank along with a horse after running into the tow of the steamer Twilight near Redstone Creek in Fayette County, Pennsylvania. She was raised after 28 days.
