= Frank Vertosick =

American neurosurgeon (born 1955)

Frank Vertosick Jr. is an American neurosurgeon. He is best known as the author of the book When the Air Hits Your Brain: Tales of Neurosurgery, which chronicles his neurosurgical residency training. He also authored Why We Hurt: The Natural History of Pain (2000) and The Genius Within: Discovering the Intelligence of Every Living Thing (2002).

Born in 1955 in Harwick, Pennsylvania, Vertosick attended the University of Pittsburgh where he majored in physics before entering the University of Pittsburgh School of Medicine. He stayed at the University of Pittsburgh for his residency training in neurosurgery. After residency, he served as the Associate Chief of Neurosurgery and associate director for Neuro-Oncology at Western Pennsylvania Hospital in Pittsburgh. He retired from surgery due to Parkinson's disease in 2002, but still treats office patients in Washington, Pennsylvania.

Vertosick is also a black belt in tang soo do and was a consultant to the head writer of the TV drama Chicago Hope.
