= Blanchard, Pennsylvania =

Blanchard, Pennsylvania may refer to:

- Blanchard, Allegheny County, Pennsylvania
- Blanchard, Centre County, Pennsylvania
