= Liberty Township, Allegheny County, Pennsylvania =

Liberty Township
- Former township
- Location within the state of Pennsylvania
- Coordinates: 40.446°N 79.924°W
- Country: United States
- State: Pennsylvania
- County: Allegheny
- Established: December 3, 1864
- Dissolved: June 30, 1868

Liberty Township was a short-lived township of Allegheny County, Pennsylvania, in the east of what is now Pittsburgh. It was formed on December 3, 1864, from a portion of Peebles Township. Its territory lay south of Penn Avenue and included the present-day neighborhoods of Shadyside, Point Breeze and Friendship, and parts of East Liberty, Squirrel Hill, Bloomfield, and Regent Square. On June 30, 1868, Liberty Township and its neighboring municipalities of Peebles, Collins, Pitt, Oakland, and Lawrenceville were annexed to Pittsburgh.

Residents of Liberty included steel magnate Andrew Carnegie, general James S. Negley, railroad executive Robert Pitcairn, congressman Thomas M. Howe, and politician and judge William Wilkins.
