= Springdale Township, Pennsylvania =

Township in Pennsylvania, US

- Township
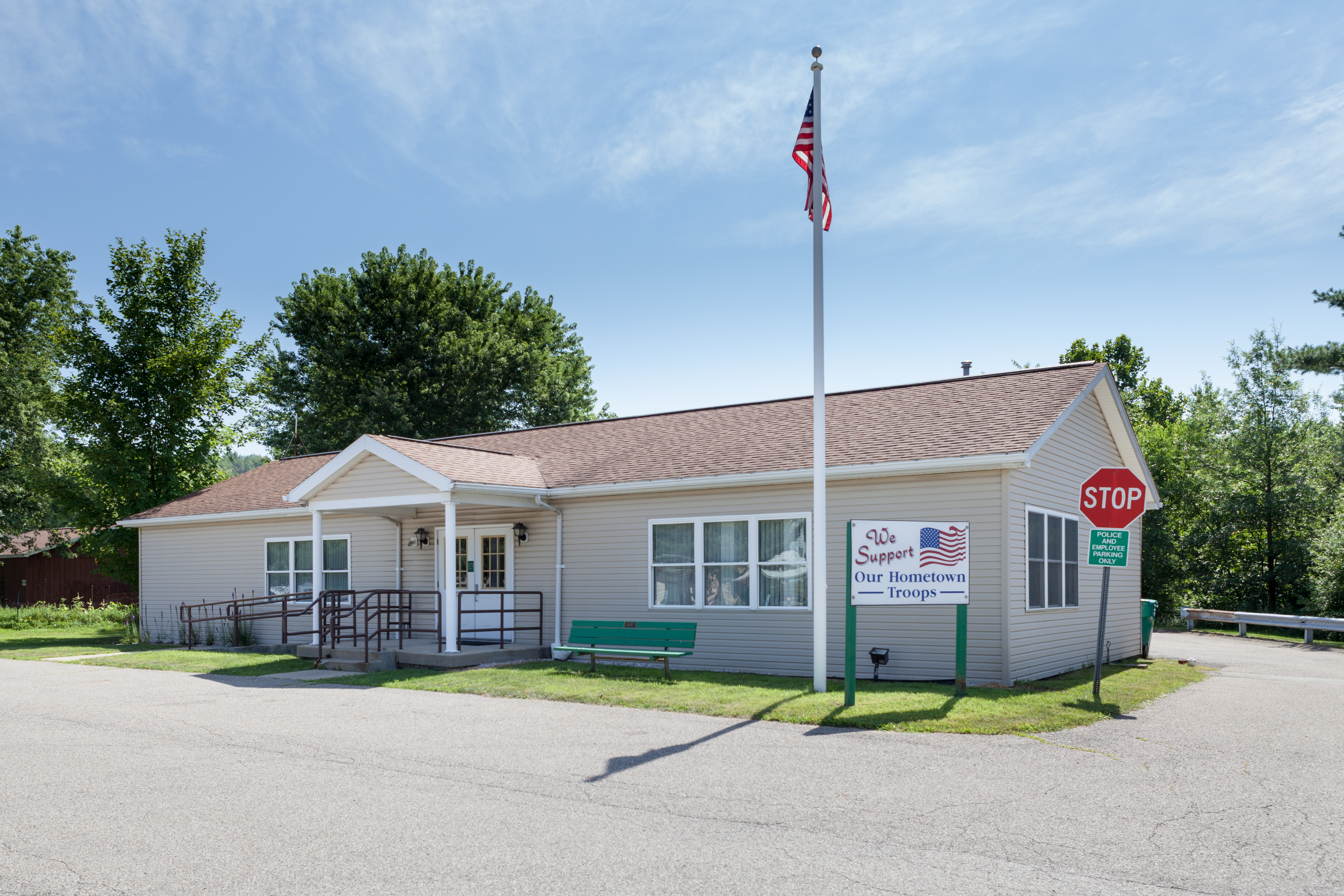
- Municipal Building

- Location in Allegheny County and the U.S. state of Pennsylvania.

- Location within Pennsylvania Location within the United States
- Coordinates: 40°33′17″N 79°47′20″W
- Country: United States
- State: Pennsylvania
- County: Allegheny
- Incorporated: 1875

Area
  - Total: 2.41 sq mi (6.23 km^{2})
  - Land: 2.25 sq mi (5.84 km^{2})
  - Water: 0.15 sq mi (0.39 km^{2})
- Elevation: 1,099 ft (335 m)

Population (2010)
  - Total: 1,636
  - Estimate (2018): 1,583
  - Density: 711.5/sq mi (274.72/km^{2})
- Time zone: UTC-5 (EST)
  - Summer (DST): UTC-4 (EDT)
- ZIP codes: 15024, 15049, 15084, 15144
- Area code: 724
- FIPS code: 42-003-72968
- Website: http://www.springdaletwp.us/

Springdale Township is a township in Allegheny County, Pennsylvania, United States. It contains the two communities of Orrville and Harwick. The population was 1,636 at the 2010 census.

== Geography ==
Springdale Township is located at 40°33′17″N 79°47′20″W (40.55474 -79.78914). According to the United States Census Bureau, the township has a total area of 2.4 square miles (6.2 km^{2}), of which 2.2 square miles (5.7 km^{2}) is land and 0.2 square miles (0.52 km^{2}), or 6.28%, is water.

=== Surrounding and adjacent neighborhoods ===
Springdale Township has two land borders, including Springdale and Cheswick to the south, Harmar Township to the west, and Frazier and East Deer townships to the north. Across the Allegheny River to the east are Plum and New Kensington.

== Demographics ==
Historical population
Census	Pop.	Note	%±
1970	2,218		—
1980	1,918		−13.5%
1990	1,777		−7.4%
2000	1,802		1.4%
2010	1,636		−9.2%
2018 (est.)	1,583		−3.2%
U.S. Decennial Census

At the time of the 2000 census, there were 1,802 people, 797 households, and 536 families living in the township.

The population density was 804.9 inhabitants per square mile (310.8/km^{2}). There were 838 housing units at an average density of 374.3 per square mile (144.5/km^{2}).

The racial makeup of the township was 99.61% White, 0.06% African American, and 0.33% from two or more races. Hispanic or Latino of any race were 0.11%.

There were 797 households, 22.7% had children under the age of 18 living with them, 54.0% were married couples living together, 9.5% had a female householder with no husband present, and 32.7% were non-families. 28.4% of households were made up of individuals, and 11.5% were one person aged 65 or older.

The average household size was 2.26 and the average family size was 2.75.

The age distribution was 18.6% under the age of 18, 5.2% from 18 to 24, 27.3% from 25 to 44, 28.4% from 45 to 64, and 20.5% 65 or older. The median age was 44 years.

For every 100 females, there were 92.9 males. For every 100 females age 18 and over, there were 88.2 males.

The median household income was $39,071 and the median family income was $43,269. Males had a median income of $33,472 versus $29,375 for females.

The per capita income for the township was $21,598.

Approximately 3.8% of families and 5.0% of the population were living below the poverty line, including 3.7% of those under age 18 and 4.4% of those age 65 or over.

== Government and politics ==
Presidential election results
Year	Republican	Democratic	Third parties
2020	57% 567	41% 407	1% 13
2016	58% 492	41% 352	1% 7
2012	54% 441	46% 377	1% 4

== Education ==
Springdale Township is served by the Allegheny Valley School District, which utilizes Springdale Jr-Sr High School.

== Recreation ==
Recreational areas of Springdale Township include Agan Park, Marina Park, Harwick Park, Williams Street Park, and the Pennsylvania State Game Lands Number 203.

== Communities ==
- Harwick
- Orrville
