= Greenock, Pennsylvania =

Unincorporated community in Pennsylvania, US

Coordinates: 40°18′44″N 79°48′24″W

- CDP
- Interactive map of Greenock, Pennsylvania
- Country: United States
- State: Pennsylvania
- County: Allegheny

Area
  - Total: 1.15 sq mi (2.98 km^{2})
  - Land: 1.07 sq mi (2.76 km^{2})
  - Water: 0.085 sq mi (0.22 km^{2})
- Elevation: 889 ft (271 m)

Population (2020)
  - Total: 1,989
  - Density: 1,866.4/sq mi (720.64/km^{2})
- Time zone: UTC-5 (Eastern (EST))
  - Summer (DST): UTC-4 (EDT)
- ZIP codes: 15047, 15135
- Area code: 412
- FIPS code: 42-31120
- GNIS feature ID: 1176165

Greenock is a census-designated place (CDP) in Elizabeth Township, Allegheny County, Pennsylvania, United States. As of the 2020 US Census the population was 1,989.

The community was named after Greenock, Scotland.

Greenock is home to 2 churches, 1 school, 1 volunteer fire company, 2 baseball fields, and 2 cemeteries.

== Demographics ==
Historical population
| Census | Pop. | Note | %± |
|---|---|---|---|
| 2020 | 1,989 | | — |
U.S. Decennial Census
