= Wildwood, Pennsylvania =

Unincorporated community in Pennsylvania, US

Coordinates: 40°35′39″N 79°58′12″W

Wildwood is an unincorporated village in Hampton Township, Allegheny County, Pennsylvania, United States.
