= Elfinwild, Pennsylvania =

Unincorporated community in Pennsylvania, US

Coordinates: 40°32′55″N 79°57′35″W

- Unincorporated village
- Interactive map of Elfinwild, Pennsylvania
- Country: United States
- State: Pennsylvania
- County: Allegheny
- Township: Shaler
- Time zone: UTC-5 (EST)
  - Summer (DST): UTC-4 (EDT)

Elfinwild is an unincorporated village in Allegheny County, Pennsylvania, United States. It is part of Shaler Township, within the Glenshaw census-designated place. Pine Creek flows through the community.
