= Peebles Township, Allegheny County, Pennsylvania =

Peebles Township
- Former Township
- Location within the state of Pennsylvania
- Coordinates: 40.43°N 79.93°W
- Country: United States
- State: Pennsylvania
- County: Allegheny
- Established: 26 November 1833
- Dissolved: 30 June 1868
- Time zone: UTC-5 (Eastern (EST))
  - Summer (DST): UTC-4 (EDT)

Peebles Township was a township in Allegheny County, Pennsylvania. Created out of Pitt Township in 1833, it originally included most of what is now the eastern part of the city of Pittsburgh from the Monongahela River in the south (today's Hazelwood) to the Allegheny River in the north. Portions of Peebles broke away to form the borough of Lawrenceville (1834) and the townships of Collins (1850) and Liberty (1864). Those municipalities and the remainder of Peebles Township were incorporated into Pittsburgh in 1868.
