= Russellton, Pennsylvania =

Unincorporated community in Pennsylvania, US

- Census-designated place
- Location in Allegheny County and state of Pennsylvania
- Coordinates: 40°36′39″N 79°50′13″W
- Country: United States
- State: Pennsylvania
- County: Allegheny
- Township: West Deer

Area
  - Total: 1.4 sq mi (3.6 km^{2})
  - Land: 1.4 sq mi (3.6 km^{2})

Population (2020)
  - Total: 1,330
  - Density: 950/sq mi (370/km^{2})
- Time zone: UTC-5 (Eastern (EST))
  - Summer (DST): UTC-4 (EDT)
- ZIP code: 15076
- Area code: 724

Russellton is a census-designated place (CDP) in Allegheny County, Pennsylvania, United States. The population was 1,330 at the 2020 census.

== Geography ==
Russellton is located at 40°36′39″N 79°50′13″W (40.610886, −79.837056).

According to the United States Census Bureau, the CDP has a total area of 1.4 square miles (3.7 km^{2}), all land.

Russellton was really at one point two towns, Russellton #1 and Russellton #2, named after the mines that were in each area. Russellton #1 was originally Grays Mill; the name changed about 1907.

== Demographics ==
At the 2000 census, there were 1,530 people, 616 households, and 450 families living in the CDP. The population density was 1,065.3 inhabitants per square mile (411.3/km^{2}). There were 645 housing units at an average density of 449.1 per square mile (173.4/km^{2}). The racial makeup of the CDP was 98.17% White, 0.39% African American, 0.13% Native American, 0.52% Asian, and 0.78% from two or more races. Hispanic or Latino of any race were 0.65%.

There were 616 households, 29.9% had children under the age of 18 living with them, 56.7% were married couples living together, 12.7% had a female householder with no husband present, and 26.9% were non-families. 23.2% of households were made up of individuals, and 10.4% were one person aged 65 or older. The average household size was 2.48 and the average family size was 2.94.

The age distribution was 22.3% under the age of 18, 6.6% from 18 to 24, 28.8% from 25 to 44, 27.5% from 45 to 64, and 14.8% 65 or older. The median age was 40 years. For every 100 females, there were 94.7 males. For every 100 females age 18 and over, there were 92.7 males.

The median household income was $46,635 and the median family income was $52,250. Males had a median income of $35,694 versus $25,407 for females. The per capita income for the CDP was $20,682. About 5.1% of families and 6.4% of the population were below the poverty line, including 8.9% of those under age 18 and 12.9% of those age 65 or over.
