= Bethany Hallam =

American politician (born 1989)

At-Large member of Allegheny County Council
- Incumbent
- Assumed office January 2, 2020
- Preceded by: John DeFazio

Personal details
- Born: November 12, 1989 (age 35)
- Political party: Democratic
- Education: Duquesne University
- Website: https://www.bethanyhallam.com

Bethany Hallam is an American politician. Since 2020, she has served as one of two at-large members of Allegheny County Council.

== Early life ==
Hallam grew up in Ross Township, and graduated from Duquesne University.

== Political career ==
Hallam defeated a 20-year County Council incumbent, John DeFazio, in the 2019 Democratic primary, & secured the at-large seat in the following general election, making her one of a small number of formerly incarcerated people elected to office in the United States. She was sworn in on January 2nd, 2020.

Hallam has been an advocate for a number of causes including criminal justice reform, criminal justice fine & fee reform, abolition of cash bail, harm reduction, and increasing the availability of substance use disorder recovery programs. She is known for her willingness to engage with people who disagree with her.

In her position as a County Councilor, Hallam serves on Allegheny County Jail’s Jail Oversight Board, Allegheny County’s Board of Elections, & Carnegie Library of Pittsburgh’s board of trustees.

== Electoral record ==
2023 Allegheny County Council At-Large election
Party	Candidate	Votes	%
Democratic	Bethany Hallam	203,394	56.78
Republican	Sam DeMarco	151,023	42.16
Write-in		3,806	1.06
Total votes		358,223	100.00

2023 Allegheny County Council At-Large election, Democratic primary
Party	Candidate	Votes	%
Democratic	Bethany Hallam	89,464	56.33
Democratic	Joanna Doven	68,393	43.06
Write-in		969	0.61
Total votes		158,826	100.00

2019 Allegheny County Council At-Large election
Party	Candidate	Votes	%
Democratic	Bethany Hallam	168,350	64.67
Republican	Sam DeMarco	91,615	35.19
Write-in		367	0.14
Total votes		260,332	100.00

2019 Allegheny County Council At-Large election, Democratic primary
Party	Candidate	Votes	%
Democratic	Bethany Hallam	55,695	53.38
Democratic	John P. DeFazio	48,275	46.27
Write-in		363	0.35
Total votes		104,333	100.00
