= McKnight, Pennsylvania =

Unincorporated community in Pennsylvania, U.S.

Coordinates: 40°33′18″N 80°02′11″W

McKnight is an unincorporated community in Allegheny County, Pennsylvania, United States. The area known as McKnight is located in the municipality of Ross Township, in suburban Pittsburgh, and in the North Hills School District.

McKnight's zip code is 15237.
