= Mount Vernon, Pennsylvania =

Unincorporated community in Pennsylvania, US

Mount Vernon
- Unincorporated community
- Location within the state of Pennsylvania Mount Vernon (the United States)
- Coordinates: 40°17′30″N 79°48′39″W
- Country: United States
- State: Pennsylvania
- County: Allegheny
- Township: Elizabeth Township
- Elevation: 1,076 ft (328 m)
- Time zone: UTC-5 (Eastern (EST))
  - Summer (DST): UTC-4 (EDT)
- GNIS feature ID: 1181874

Mount Vernon is an unincorporated community located within Elizabeth Township, Allegheny County, Pennsylvania, United States.
