= Curtisville, Pennsylvania =

Unincorporated community in Pennsylvania, US

- Census-designated place
- Location in Allegheny County and state of Pennsylvania
- Coordinates: 40°38′36″N 79°50′43″W
- Country: United States
- State: Pennsylvania
- County: Allegheny
- Township: West Deer

Area
  - Total: 1.42 sq mi (3.69 km^{2})
  - Land: 1.42 sq mi (3.69 km^{2})
  - Water: 0 sq mi (0.00 km^{2})

Population (2020)
  - Total: 1,097
  - Density: 770.6/sq mi (297.53/km^{2})
- Time zone: UTC-5 (Eastern (EST))
  - Summer (DST): UTC-4 (EDT)
- ZIP code: 15032
- Area code: 724
- FIPS code: 42-17832

Curtisville is a census-designated place (CDP) in West Deer Township, Pennsylvania, United States. The population was 1,097 at the 2020 census.

== Geography ==
Curtisville is located at 40°38′36″N 79°50′43″W (40.643248, -79.845371).

According to the United States Census Bureau, the CDP has a total area of 1.4 square miles (3.6 km^{2}), all land. Curtisville is within West Deer Township.

== Demographics ==
Historical population
Census	Pop.	Note	%±
2020	1,097		—
U.S. Decennial Census

At the 2000 census, there were 1,173 people, 498 households, and 330 families living in the CDP. The population density was 822.5 inhabitants per square mile (317.6/km^{2}). There were 528 housing units at an average density of 370.2 per square mile (142.9/km^{2}). The racial makeup of the CDP was 98.81% White, 0.09% African American, 0.09% Asian, 0.26% from other races, and 0.77% from two or more races. Hispanic or Latino of any race were 1.11%.

There were 498 households, 29.1% had children under the age of 18 living with them, 48.6% were married couples living together, 11.8% had a female householder with no husband present, and 33.7% were non-families. 29.7% of households were made up of individuals, and 13.9% were one person aged 65 or older. The average household size was 2.36 and the average family size was 2.89.

The age distribution was 23.0% under the age of 18, 6.6% from 18 to 24, 32.7% from 25 to 44, 22.1% from 45 to 64, and 15.6% 65 or older. The median age was 39 years. For every 100 females, there were 93.2 males. For every 100 females age 18 and over, there were 88.5 males.

The median household income was $31,304 and the median family income was $36,900. Males had a median income of $38,125 versus $23,710 for females. The per capita income for the CDP was $14,143. About 15.4% of families and 18.7% of the population were below the poverty line, including 24.3% of those under age 18 and 5.6% of those age 65 or over.

== History ==
Curtisville was really three towns: Curtisville #1, Curtisville #2, and Curtisville #3 (now Bairdford), named after the mines that were in each area. For more information on Curtisville go to http://freepages.history.rootsweb.ancestry.com/~westdeertownship/West_Deer_1836-1986-final8.htm#_Toc82621316.
