= Allegheny County, Pennsylvania =

County in Pennsylvania, United States

- County
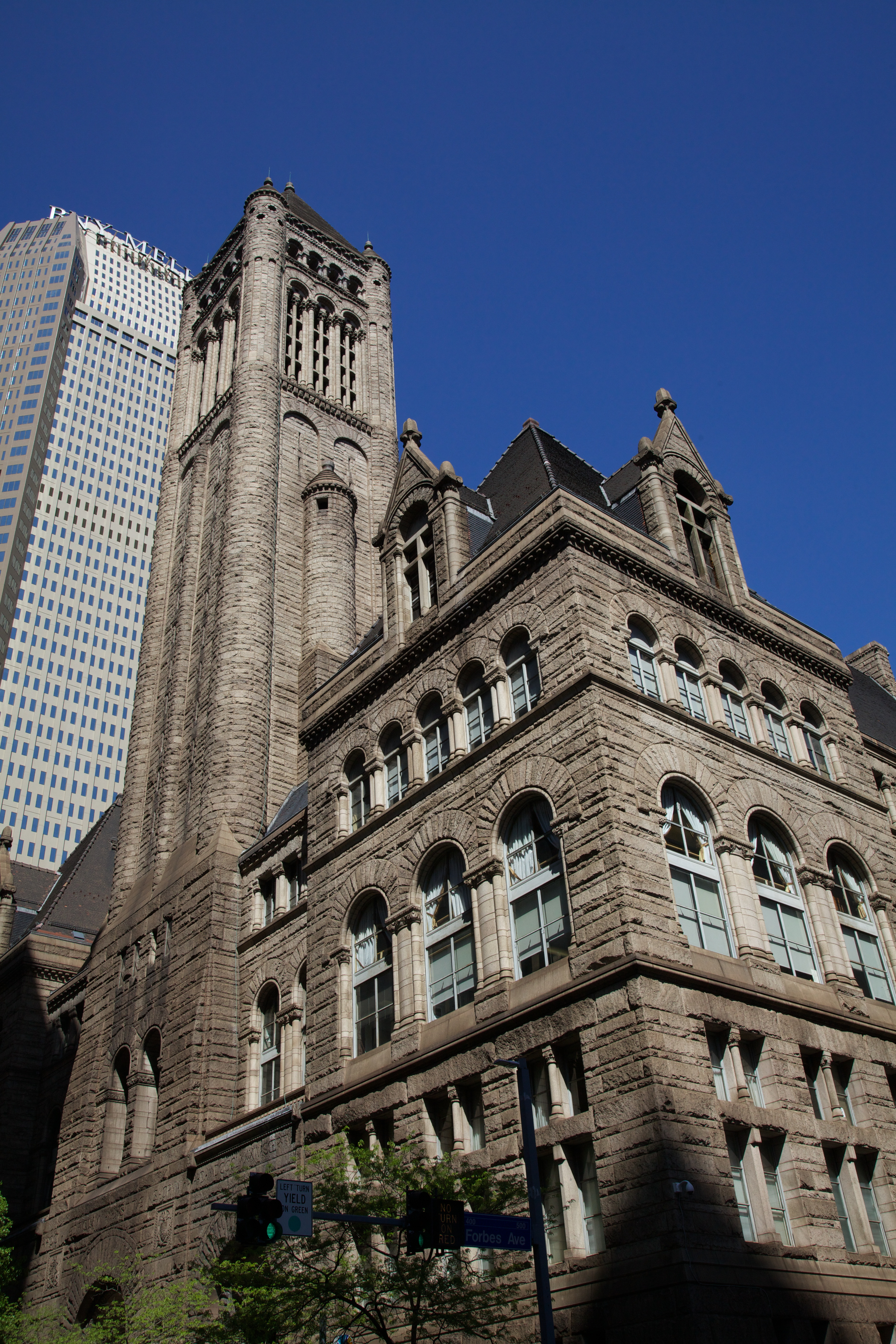
- Allegheny County Courthouse

- Flag Seal Logo

- Location within the U.S. state of Pennsylvania
- Interactive map of Allegheny County, Pennsylvania
- Coordinates: 40°26′08″N 80°01′28″W
- Country: United States
- State: Pennsylvania
- Founded: September 24, 1788
- Named for: Allegheny River
- Seat: Pittsburgh
- Largest city: Pittsburgh

Area
  - Total: 745 sq mi (1,930 km^{2})
  - Land: 730 sq mi (1,900 km^{2})
  - Water: 14 sq mi (36 km^{2}) 1.9%

Population (2020)
  - Total: 1,250,578
  - Estimate (2025): 1,225,035 ▼
  - Density: 1,700/sq mi (660/km^{2})

GDP
  - Total: $132.892 billion (2024)
- Time zone: UTC−5 (Eastern)
  - Summer (DST): UTC−4 (EDT)
- Congressional districts: 12th, 17th
- Website: alleghenycounty.us

Pennsylvania Historical Marker
- Designated: December 30, 1982

Allegheny County (/ˌælɪˈɡeɪni/ AL-ig-AY-nee) is a large urban county in Pennsylvania, United States. As of the 2025 census estimate, the population was 1,225,035, a 2% decrease of 25,543 residents since 2020, making it the state's second-most populous county, after Philadelphia County. Its county seat and largest city is Pittsburgh, Pennsylvania's second largest city. The county is part of the Greater Pittsburgh region of the commonwealth, (Note: Includes Allegheny, Washington, Butler, Beaver, Lawrence and Armstrong Counties) and is the center of the Pittsburgh media market.

Allegheny was the first county in Pennsylvania to be given a Native American name. It was named after the Lenape word for the Allegheny River. The meaning of "Allegheny" is uncertain. It is usually said to mean "fine river". Some historians state that the name may come from a Lenape account of an ancient mythical tribe called "Allegewi" who lived along the river before being taken over by the Lenape.

== History ==
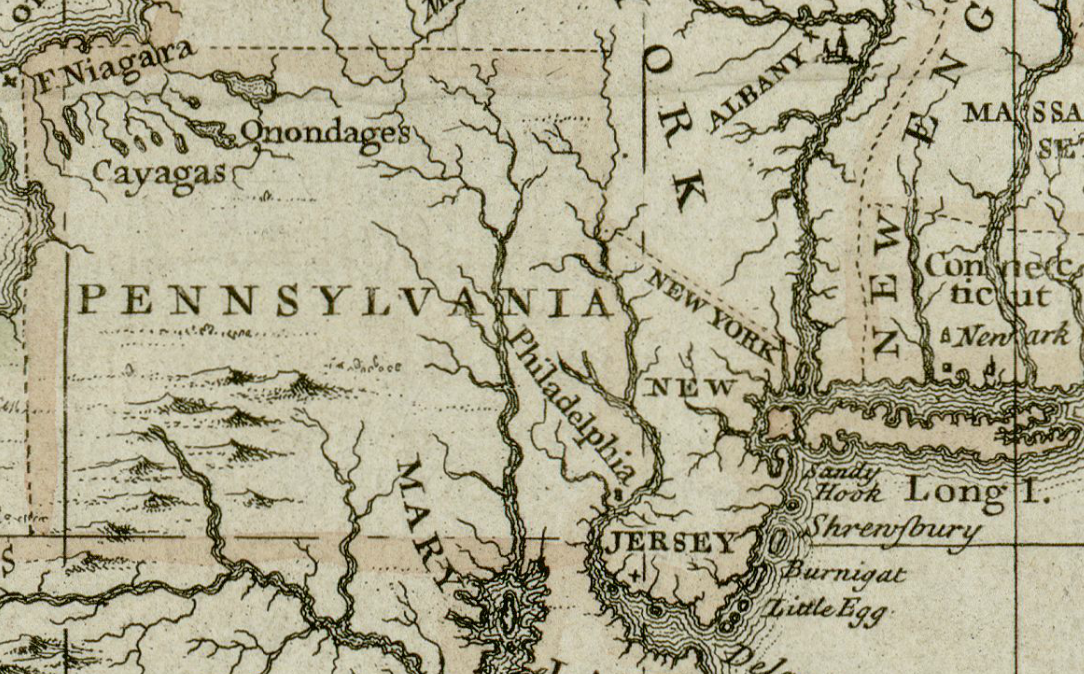
1680 British map of Western Pennsylvania and Allegheny County from the Darlington Collection

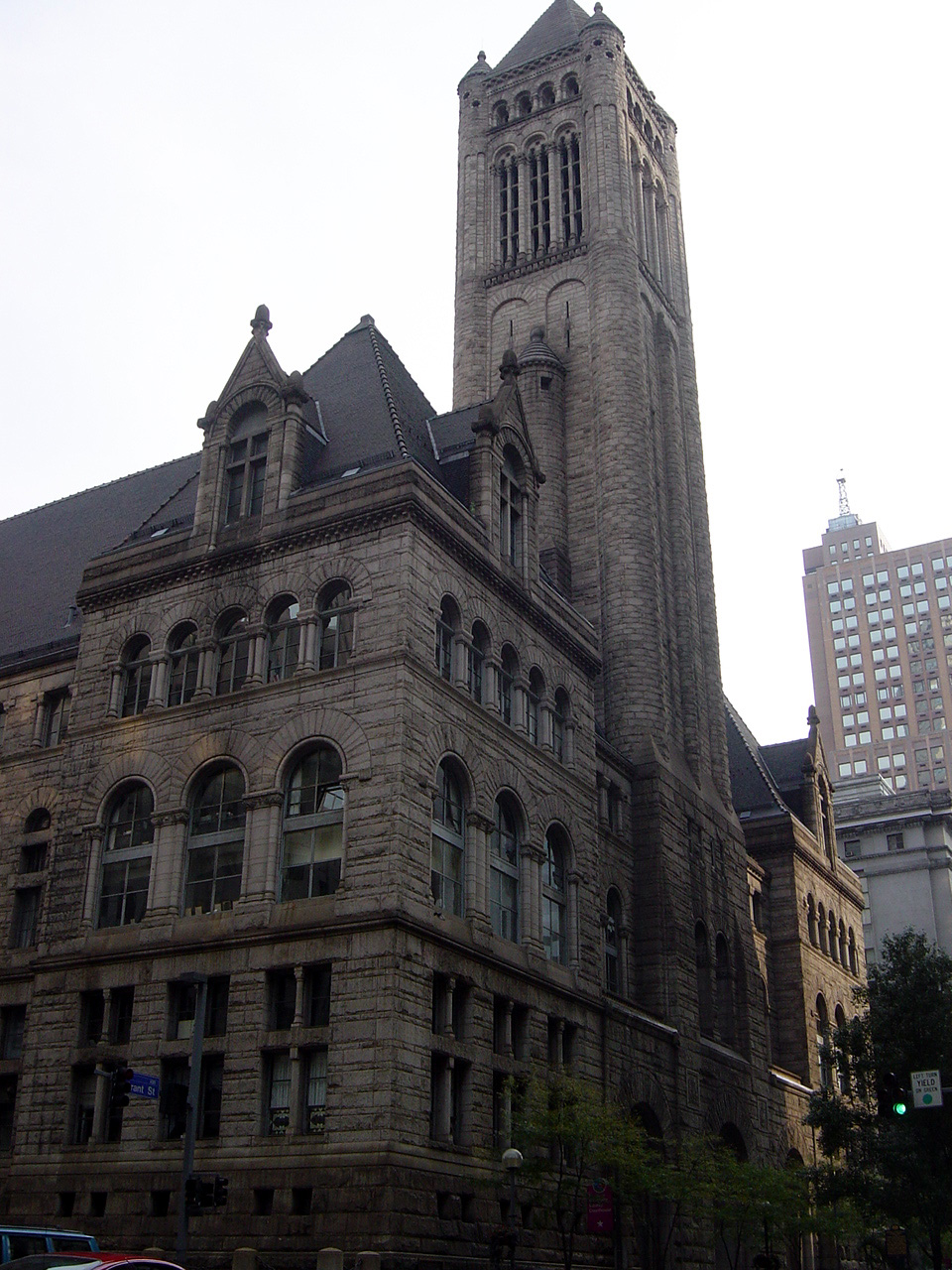
Allegheny County Courthouse

Prior to European contact, this area was settled for thousands of years by succeeding cultures of indigenous peoples. During the colonial era, historic native groups known by the colonists to settle in the area included members of western nations of the Iroquois, such as the Seneca; the Lenape, who had been pushed from the East by European-American settlers; the Shawnee, who also had territory in Ohio; and the Mingo, a group made up of a variety of peoples from more eastern tribes.

European fur traders such as Peter Chartier established trading posts in the region in the early eighteenth century.

In 1749, Captain Pierre Joseph Céloron de Blainville claimed the Ohio Valley and all of western Pennsylvania for King Louis XV of France. The captain traveled along the Ohio and Allegheny rivers. He installed lead plates in the ground to mark the land for France.

Most of the towns during that era were developed along waterways, which were the primary transportation routes, as well as providing water for domestic uses. Through the eighteenth century, both the French and the British competed for control over the local rivers in this frontier territory of North America. Native American bands and tribes allied with the colonists to differing degrees, often based on their trading relationships. The British sent Major George Washington to expel the French from their posts, with no success. He also nearly drowned in the ice-filled Allegheny River while returning to camp.

The English tried again in 1754 to establish a post in the area. They sent 41 Virginians to build Fort Prince George. The French learned of the plan and sent an army to capture the fort. They resumed building it and added increased defensive fortification, renaming it as Fort Duquesne.

Given its strategic location at the Ohio, Fort Duquesne became an important focal point of the French and Indian War. The first British attempt to retake the fort, the Braddock Expedition, failed miserably. In 1758 British forces under General John Forbes recaptured the fort; he had it destroyed to prevent any use by the French. The British built a new, larger fort on the site, including a moat, and named it Fort Pitt. The historic site has been preserved as Pittsburgh's Point State Park.

Under their colonial charters, both Pennsylvania and Virginia claimed the region that is now Allegheny County. Pennsylvania administered most of the region as part of its Westmoreland County. Virginia considered everything south of the Ohio River and east of the Allegheny River to be part of its Yohogania County, and governed it from Fort Dunmore. In addition, parts of the county were located in the proposed British colony of Vandalia and the proposed U.S. state of Westsylvania. The overlapping boundaries, multiple governments, and confused deed claims soon proved unworkable. Near the end of the American Revolutionary War, in 1780 Pennsylvania and Virginia agreed to extend the Mason–Dixon line westward. This region was assigned to Pennsylvania. From 1781 until 1788, much of what Virginia had claimed as part of Yohogania County was administered as a part of the newly created Washington County, Pennsylvania.

Allegheny County was officially created on September 24, 1788, from parts of Washington and Westmoreland counties. It was formed to respond to pressure from the increase in settlers living in the area around Pittsburgh; this was designated as the county seat in 1791. The county originally extended north to the shores of Lake Erie; it was reduced to its current borders by 1800. As population increased in the territory, other counties were organized.

In the 1790s, the United States federal government imposed a whiskey excise tax. Farmers who had depended on whiskey income refused to pay and started the so-called Whiskey Rebellion after driving off tax collector John Neville. After a series of demonstrations by farmers, President George Washington sent troops to suppress the frontier rebellion.

The area developed rapidly through the 1800s with industrialization. It became the nation's prime steel producer by the late 19th century and Pittsburgh was nicknamed "Steel Capital of the World".

In 1913, the county's 125th anniversary was celebrated with a week-long series of events. The final day, September 27, was marked by a steamboat parade of 30 paddle wheelers. They traveled from Monongahela Wharf down the Ohio to the Davis Island Dam. The boats in line were the Steel City (formerly the Pittsburgh and Cincinnati packet Virginia), the flag ship; City of Parkersburg, Charles Brown, Alice Brown, Exporter, Sam Brown, Boaz, Raymond Horner, Swan, Sunshine, I. C. Woodward, Cruiser, Volunteer, A. R. Budd, J. C. Risher, Clyde, Rival, Voyager, Jim Brown, Rover, Charlie Clarke, Robt. J. Jenkins, Slipper, Bertha, Midland Sam Barnum, Cadet, Twilight, and Troubadour.

== Geography ==
According to the U.S. Census Bureau, the county has a total area of 745 square miles (1,930 km^{2}), of which 730 square miles (1,900 km^{2}) is land and 14 square miles (36 km^{2}) (1.9%) is water.

Four major rivers traverse Allegheny County: the Allegheny River and the Monongahela River converge at Downtown Pittsburgh to form the Ohio River. The Youghiogheny River flows into the Monongahela River at McKeesport, 10 miles (16 km) to the southeast. There are several islands in these courses. The rivers drain via the Mississippi River into the Gulf of Mexico. Although the county's industrial growth resulted in clearcutting of the area's forests, a significant amount of woodland has regrown.

=== Adjacent counties ===
- Butler County (north)
- Armstrong County (northeast)
- Westmoreland County (east and south)
- Washington County (southwest)
- Beaver County (northwest)

=== Major roads and highways ===
- I-76
- I-79
- I-279
- I-376
  - I-376 BL (Pittsburgh International Airport)
- I-579
- US 19
- US 22
  - US 22 Bus. (Monroeville)
- US 30
- PA 8
- PA 28
- PA Turnpike 43
- PA 48
- PA 50
- PA 51
- PA 60
- PA 65
- PA 88
- PA 121
- PA 130
- PA 136
- PA 148
- PA 286
- PA 366
- PA 380
- PA Turnpike 576
- PA 791
- PA 837
- PA 885
- PA 906
- PA 910
- PA 978
- PA 980

=== Climate ===
Allegheny has a humid continental climate which is hot-summer, (Dfa) except in higher elevations, where it is warm-summer (Dfb).

Climate data for Pittsburgh (Pittsburgh International Airport), 1991–2020 normals, (Note: Mean monthly maxima and minima (i.e. the highest and lowest temperature readings during an entire month or year) calculated based on data at said location from 1991 to 2020.) extremes 1874–present (Note: Records kept September 1874 to June 1935 at the Weather Bureau Office across the Allegheny River from downtown, at Allegheny County Airport from July 1935 to 14 September 1952, and at Pittsburgh Int'l (KPIT) since 15 September 1952. Due to its river valley and urban location as well as elevation, many of the summertime warm minima temperature records set at the WBO have not even come close to being matched at KPIT, which is at-elevation and located in the western suburbs. For more information, see Threadex)
Month	Jan	Feb	Mar	Apr	May	Jun	Jul	Aug	Sep	Oct	Nov	Dec	Year
Record high °F (°C)	75 (24)	78 (26)	84 (29)	90 (32)	95 (35)	98 (37)	103 (39)	103 (39)	102 (39)	91 (33)	82 (28)	74 (23)	103 (39)
Mean maximum °F (°C)	61.5 (16.4)	63.2 (17.3)	73.5 (23.1)	81.5 (27.5)	86.8 (30.4)	90.4 (32.4)	91.3 (32.9)	90.3 (32.4)	88.2 (31.2)	79.9 (26.6)	70.8 (21.6)	62.6 (17.0)	92.6 (33.7)
Mean daily maximum °F (°C)	36.3 (2.4)	39.6 (4.2)	49.1 (9.5)	62.4 (16.9)	71.9 (22.2)	79.4 (26.3)	82.9 (28.3)	81.7 (27.6)	75.1 (23.9)	63.1 (17.3)	50.9 (10.5)	40.6 (4.8)	61.1 (16.2)
Daily mean °F (°C)	28.8 (−1.8)	31.4 (−0.3)	39.7 (4.3)	51.5 (10.8)	61.2 (16.2)	69.4 (20.8)	73.2 (22.9)	71.8 (22.1)	64.9 (18.3)	53.4 (11.9)	42.6 (5.9)	33.7 (0.9)	51.8 (11.0)
Mean daily minimum °F (°C)	21.4 (−5.9)	23.2 (−4.9)	30.3 (−0.9)	40.7 (4.8)	50.6 (10.3)	59.3 (15.2)	63.4 (17.4)	62.0 (16.7)	54.8 (12.7)	43.7 (6.5)	34.3 (1.3)	26.7 (−2.9)	42.5 (5.8)
Mean minimum °F (°C)	1.0 (−17.2)	5.0 (−15.0)	11.7 (−11.3)	25.4 (−3.7)	35.6 (2.0)	45.2 (7.3)	52.5 (11.4)	51.1 (10.6)	41.2 (5.1)	29.5 (−1.4)	19.3 (−7.1)	9.7 (−12.4)	−1.5 (−18.6)
Record low °F (°C)	−22 (−30)	−20 (−29)	−5 (−21)	11 (−12)	26 (−3)	34 (1)	42 (6)	39 (4)	31 (−1)	16 (−9)	−1 (−18)	−12 (−24)	−22 (−30)
Average precipitation inches (mm)	2.96 (75)	2.62 (67)	3.15 (80)	3.32 (84)	3.83 (97)	4.12 (105)	4.26 (108)	3.52 (89)	3.30 (84)	2.83 (72)	2.86 (73)	2.84 (72)	39.61 (1,006)
Average snowfall inches (cm)	13.3 (34)	11.7 (30)	7.6 (19)	1.0 (2.5)	0.0 (0.0)	0.0 (0.0)	0.0 (0.0)	0.0 (0.0)	0.0 (0.0)	0.4 (1.0)	2.4 (6.1)	7.7 (20)	44.1 (112)
Average precipitation days (≥ 0.01 in)	16.8	13.9	14.0	13.9	13.5	12.4	11.2	10.5	9.8	11.1	12.0	14.6	153.7
Average snowy days (≥ 0.1 in)	12.2	9.3	5.9	1.6	0.0	0.0	0.0	0.0	0.0	0.3	3.3	7.6	40.2
Average relative humidity (%)	69.9	67.3	64.1	59.8	63.4	66.2	68.8	71.2	72.0	68.3	70.2	71.9	67.8
Average dew point °F (°C)	17.2 (−8.2)	18.9 (−7.3)	26.8 (−2.9)	34.5 (1.4)	45.9 (7.7)	55.2 (12.9)	60.1 (15.6)	59.5 (15.3)	53.4 (11.9)	40.8 (4.9)	32.4 (0.2)	23.2 (−4.9)	39.0 (3.9)
Mean monthly sunshine hours	93.9	108.5	155.4	182.8	217.4	242.2	254.9	228.4	196.7	167.3	99.4	74.4	2,021.3
Percentage possible sunshine	31	36	42	46	49	54	56	54	53	48	33	26	45
Average ultraviolet index	2	2	2	4	6	6	6	5	4	3	2	1	4
Source 1: NOAA (relative humidity, dew point and sun 1961–1990)
Source 2: Weather Atlas (UV)

== Government and politics ==
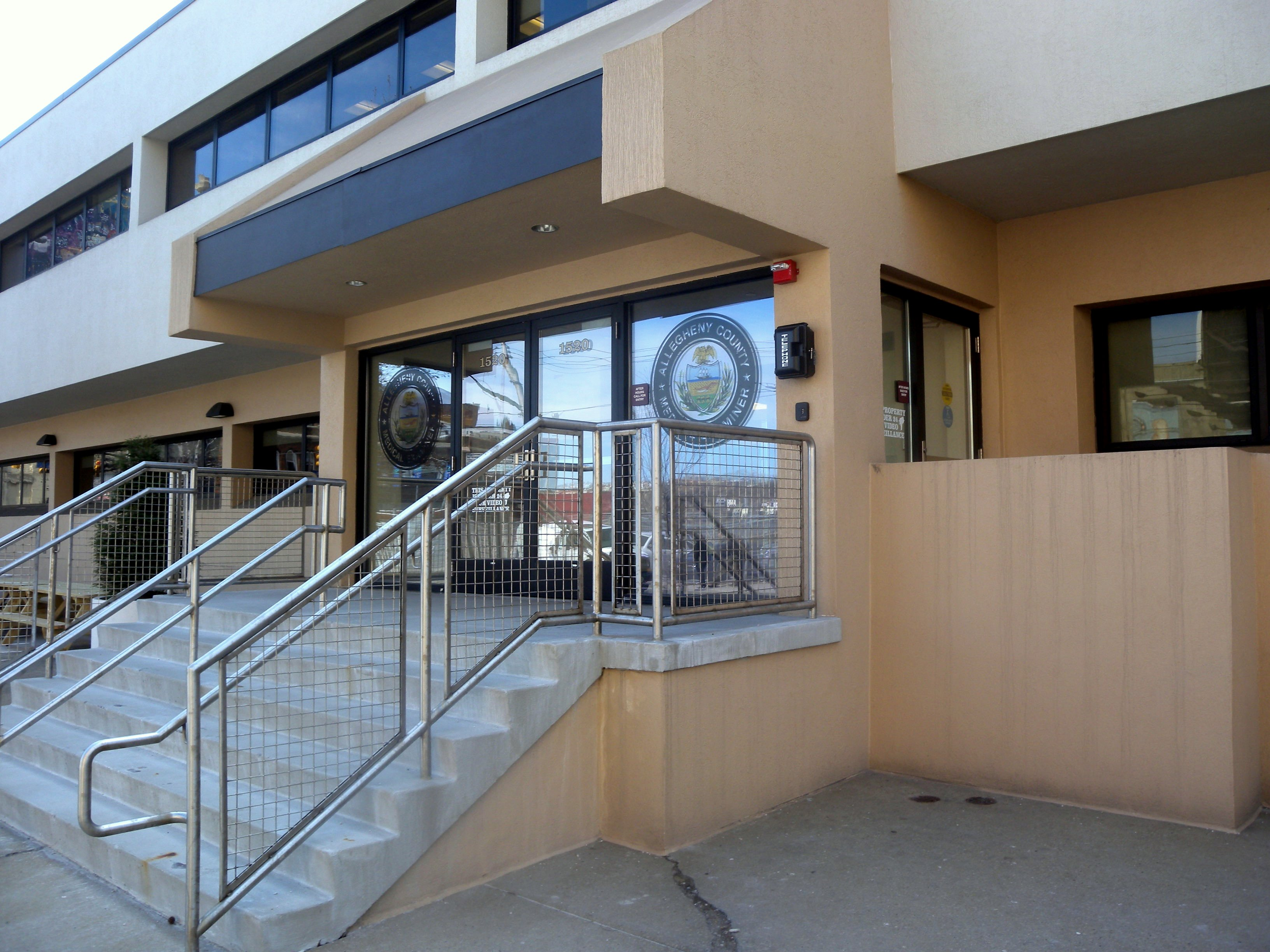
County Medical Examiner office

Until January 1, 2000, Allegheny County's government was defined under Pennsylvania's Second Class County Code. The county government was charged with all local activities, including elections, prisons, airports, public health, and city planning. All public offices were headed by elected citizens. There were three elected county commissioners.

On January 1, 2000, the Home-Rule Charter went into effect. It replaced the three elected commissioners with an elected chief officer (the County Executive), a county council with 15 members (13 elected by district, two elected county-wide), and an appointed county manager. The changes were intended to maintain a separation of powers between the executive and legislative branches while providing greater citizen control.

The county has 130 self-governing municipalities, the most in the state. (Luzerne is second with 76). The county has one Second Class City (Pittsburgh) and three Third Class Cities (Clairton, Duquesne, and McKeesport).

A 2004 study found the county would be better served by consolidating the southeastern portion of the county (which includes many small communities with modest economies) into a large municipality ("Rivers City") with a combined population of approximately 250,000.

=== Government structure ===
Allegheny County has had a home-rule charter form of government since 2000. The county has three branches: the executive, the legislative, and the judicial. The executive branch consists of the county executive, who is elected for a four-year term and serves as the chief executive officer of the county, and the county manager, who is appointed by the county executive and oversees the daily operations of the county departments. The current county executive is Sara Innamorato, a Democrat who took office in 2024. The current county manager is John Fournier. The legislative branch consists of the county council, which is composed of 15 members elected for four-year terms from 13 single-member districts and two at-large representatives, currently Democrat Bethany Hallam and independent Alex Rose. The council functions as the primary legislative and policy-making body of the county. The current county council president is Patrick Catena, a Democrat who represents District 4 and was elected by his fellow council members in 2018 and 2020. The judicial branch consists of the Court of Common Pleas, which is the general trial court of the county, and the Magisterial District Courts, which are lower courts that handle minor criminal and civil cases. The judges of these courts are elected for ten-year terms. The current president judge of the Court of Common Pleas is Kimberly Berkeley Clark, who was elected by her fellow judges in 2018 for a five-year term.

=== Self-governing municipalities ===
Allegheny County has 130 self-governing municipalities, the most in the state. These include one city (Pittsburgh), 96 boroughs, 29 townships, and three home rule municipalities (Bethel Park, McCandless, and Mt. Lebanon). Each municipality has its own elected officials, such as mayor, council, commissioners, supervisors, etc., and its own local services, such as police, fire, public works, etc. Some municipalities also have their own municipal authorities that provide services such as water, sewer, transit, etc.

=== Changes to Administrative Divisions ===
There have been several proposals to consolidate or merge some of the municipalities in Allegheny County, either with each other or with the City of Pittsburgh, to reduce costs, improve efficiency, and enhance regional cooperation. However, none of these proposals have been implemented so far. One of the most recent proposals is from Wilkinsburg, a borough that borders Pittsburgh and faces financial challenges due to declining population and tax base. In 2020, a community task force was formed to study the feasibility and impact of such a merger. The local governing council declined to adopt the merger as a legislative project, leaving the issue to constituent action. It was initially believed the merger could be settled under a 1903 Annexation law regarding municipal consolidation. Under this law, a merger could be approved following a successful referendum vote of Wilkinsburg residents and approval from the Pittsburgh City Council. However, after several court hearings, including an appeal to the Supreme Court of Pennsylvania, the 1903 law was ruled defunct. The Supreme Court communicated that residents of both Wilkinsburg and Pittsburgh would need to vote to approve a merger. Following this ruling, the merger effort has stalled, and community members have turned to a petition for Home Rule status instead.

Another recent proposal is from Allegheny County Economic Development (ACED), which is seeking to enter into an agreement with a consultant to carry out historic preservation compliance activities for projects funded by various federal programs. The consultant would help ACED develop a Programmatic Memorandum of Agreement (PMOA) with the Pennsylvania State Historic Preservation Office (SHPO) and other stakeholders to streamline the review process for projects that may affect historic properties within the county. ACED issued a Request for Proposals (RFP) for this service in January 2022 and expects to select a consultant by March 2022.

==== County Executive ====
- Sara Innamorato (D)

==== County Council ====
- Bethany Hallam (D), At-Large Member
- Alex Rose (I), At-Large Member
- Kathleen Madonna-Emmerling (D), District 1
- Suzanne Filiaggi (R), District 2
- Lissa Geiger Shulman (D), District 3
- Patrick Catena (D), District 4
- Dan Grzybek (D), District 5
- John F. Palmiere (D), Vice President, District 6
- Nicholas Futules (D), District 7
- Michelle Naccarati-Chapkis (D), President, District 8
- Aaron Adams (D), District 9
- DeWitt Walton (D), District 10,
- Paul Klein (D), District 11
- Robert Palmosina (D), District 12
- Jordan Botta (D), District 13

==== Other elected county offices ====
- Controller, Amy Weise Clements (Acting)
- District Attorney, Stephen A. Zappala Jr. (Forward)
- Sheriff, Kevin M. Kraus (D)
- Treasurer, Erica Rocchi Brusselars (D)

=== Voter registration ===
2024 Presidential Election by Township and City Harris: 50–60% 60–70% 70–80% 80–90% Trump: 40–50% 50–60% 60–70% 70–80%

United States presidential election results for Allegheny County, Pennsylvania
Year	Republican		Democratic		Third party(ies)	
Year	No.	%	No.	%	No.	%
1880	35,539	59.85%	22,096	37.21%	1,747	2.94%
1884	37,865	61.96%	19,469	31.86%	3,774	6.18%
1888	45,118	63.58%	24,710	34.82%	1,138	1.60%
1892	45,788	58.33%	30,867	39.32%	1,849	2.36%
1896	76,691	70.90%	29,809	27.56%	1,674	1.55%
1900	71,780	69.94%	27,311	26.61%	3,533	3.44%
1904	90,594	76.51%	21,541	18.19%	6,270	5.30%
1908	74,080	60.77%	35,655	29.25%	12,170	9.98%
1912	23,822	18.85%	31,417	24.86%	71,147	56.29%
1916	77,483	55.24%	52,833	37.67%	9,948	7.09%
1920	138,908	69.21%	40,278	20.07%	21,530	10.73%
1924	149,296	59.01%	21,984	8.69%	81,733	32.30%
1928	215,626	56.86%	160,733	42.39%	2,850	0.75%
1932	152,326	42.43%	189,839	52.88%	16,838	4.69%
1936	176,224	31.35%	366,593	65.21%	19,377	3.45%
1940	263,285	41.51%	367,926	58.01%	2,987	0.47%
1944	261,218	42.52%	350,690	57.09%	2,393	0.39%
1948	253,272	42.60%	326,303	54.89%	14,931	2.51%
1952	359,224	49.00%	370,945	50.60%	2,903	0.40%
1956	384,939	54.83%	315,989	45.01%	1,102	0.16%
1960	320,970	42.76%	428,455	57.07%	1,293	0.17%
1964	241,707	33.58%	475,207	66.03%	2,811	0.39%
1968	264,790	37.09%	364,906	51.12%	84,121	11.78%
1972	371,737	55.60%	282,496	42.26%	14,302	2.14%
1976	303,127	46.79%	328,343	50.68%	16,387	2.53%
1980	271,850	43.75%	297,464	47.87%	52,104	8.38%
1984	284,692	42.76%	372,576	55.96%	8,480	1.27%
1988	231,137	39.43%	348,814	59.51%	6,200	1.06%
1992	183,035	29.80%	324,004	52.75%	107,148	17.45%
1996	204,067	37.89%	284,480	52.82%	50,068	9.30%
2000	235,361	40.41%	329,963	56.65%	17,154	2.95%
2004	271,925	42.13%	368,912	57.15%	4,632	0.72%
2008	272,347	41.64%	373,153	57.05%	8,539	1.31%
2012	262,039	42.01%	352,687	56.54%	9,101	1.46%
2016	259,480	39.48%	367,617	55.94%	30,092	4.58%
2020	282,913	39.03%	430,759	59.43%	11,128	1.54%
2024	283,595	39.18%	429,916	59.40%	10,288	1.42%

As of 19 May 2025, there were 908,024 registered voters in the county; a majority were Democrats. There were 499,711 registered Democrats, 264,342 registered Republicans, 106,334 registered as independents and 37,637 registered with other parties.

Chart of voter registration
1. Democratic (55.0%)
2. Republican (29.1%)
3. Independent (11.7%)
4. Other parties (4.14%)

Voter registration and party enrollment
Party	Number of voters	Percentage
Democratic	499,711	55.03%
Republican	264,342	29.11%
Independent	106,334	11.71%
Other parties	37,637	4.14%
Total	908,024	100%

=== Political history ===
The Republican Party had been historically dominant in county-level politics in the 19th and early 20th centuries; prior to the Great Depression, Pittsburgh and Allegheny County had been majority Republican. Since the Great Depression on the state and national levels, the Democratic Party has been dominant in county-level politics. It is by far the most Democratic county in western Pennsylvania. For much of the time between the Great Depression and the turn of the millennium, it was the second-strongest Democratic bastion in Pennsylvania, behind only Philadelphia.

In 2000, Democrat Al Gore won 56% of the vote and Republican George W. Bush won 41%. In 2004, Democrat John Kerry received 57% of the vote and Republican Bush received 41%. In 2006, Democrats Governor Ed Rendell and Senator Bob Casey Jr. won 59% and 65% of the vote in Allegheny County, respectively. In 2008, Democrat Barack Obama received 57% of the vote, Republican John McCain received 41%, and each of the three state row office winners (Rob McCord for Treasurer, Jack Wagner for Auditor General, and Tom Corbett for Attorney General) also carried Allegheny. In 2016, despite Donald Trump being the first Republican to carry Pennsylvania since 1988, Hillary Clinton did slightly better than Barack Obama's 2012 vote total while Donald Trump was the worst performing Republican in 20 years. In the 2018 Midterms, Democrats received an even higher percentage of the vote with Tom Wolf and Casey receiving approximately two thirds of the county's vote. This is an improvement over the approximately 55% each person received in the county in their last election in 2014 and 2012 respectively. In 2020, Joe Biden improved upon Clinton's performance, receiving the highest vote percentage for a Democrat since Michael Dukakis in 1988 and the most votes for a Democrat since Lyndon B. Johnson in 1964. In 2024, despite Pennsylvania flipping back to Donald Trump, Allegheny voted for Kamala Harris by only a very slightly reduced margin, shifting 0.18% to the right from the previous election.

In the 21st century, populist turns to the GOP from nearly all of Appalachia in general and western Pennsylvania in particular have left the county as one of the few in the region that still supports the Democrats at a high level.

=== State representatives ===
- Aerion Abney, Democratic, 19th district
- Emily Kinkead, Democratic, 20th district
- Lindsay Powell, Democratic, 21st district
- Dan Frankel, Democratic, 23rd district
- La'Tasha Mayes, Democratic, 24th district
- Brandon Markosek, Democratic, 25th district
- Daniel J. Deasy, Democratic, 27th district
- Jeremy Shaffer, Republican, 28th district
- Arvind Venkat, Democratic, 30th district
- Joe McAndrew, Democratic, 32nd district
- Mandy Steele, Democratic, 33rd district
- Abigail Salisbury, Democratic, 34th district
- Dan Goughnour, Democratic, 35th district
- Jessica Benham, Democratic, 36th district
- John Inglis, Democratic, 38th district
- Andrew Kuzma, Republican, 39th district
- Natalie Mihalek, Republican, 40th district
- Jennifer Mazzocco, Democratic, 42nd district
- Valerie Gaydos, Republican, 44th district
- Anita Astorino Kulik, Democratic, 45th district
- Jason Ortitay, Republican, 46th district

=== State senators ===
- Devlin Robinson, Republican, 37th district
- Lindsey Williams, Democrat, 38th district
- Wayne D. Fontana, Democrat, 42nd district
- Jay Costa, Democrat, 43rd district
- Nick Pisciottano, Democrat, 45th district

=== U.S. representatives ===
- Chris Deluzio, Democrat, 17th district
- Summer Lee, Democrat, 12th district

=== U.S. Senate ===
- John Fetterman, Democratic
- Dave McCormick, Republican

United States Senate election results for Allegheny County, Pennsylvania1
Year	Republican		Democratic		Third party(ies)	
Year	No.	%	No.	%	No.	%
1916	63,554	63.67%	26,056	26.10%	10,214	10.23%
1922	68,104	64.04%	21,395	20.12%	16,845	15.84%
1922	68,104	64.04%	21,395	20.12%	16,845	15.84%
1928	162,117	70.22%	64,554	27.96%	4,210	1.82%
1934	148,154	46.04%	158,405	49.23%	15,221	4.73%
1940	224,196	43.37%	288,405	55.79%	4,310	0.83%
1946	230,114	56.03%	178,459	43.45%	2,104	0.51%
1952	291,154	49.04%	299,401	50.43%	3,115	0.52%
1958	211,405	37.89%	344,119	61.68%	2,408	0.43%
1964	204,119	33.40%	405,108	66.29%	1,845	0.30%
1970	210,485	41.46%	285,114	56.16%	12,050	2.37%
1976	261,402	48.99%	268,114	50.24%	4,119	0.77%
1982	258,409	53.51%	221,405	45.85%	3,117	0.65%
1988	338,401	63.14%	196,402	36.65%	1,114	0.21%
1991	168,402	40.93%	241,159	58.62%	1,845	0.45%
1994	205,073	46.42%	227,172	51.42%	9,562	2.16%
2000	247,405	43.77%	306,410	54.21%	11,393	2.02%
2006	161,144	35.09%	298,096	64.91%	0	0.00%
2012	236,546	38.71%	362,459	59.31%	12,106	1.98%
2018	176,351	32.55%	355,907	65.70%	9,445	1.74%
2024	272,861	38.11%	425,280	59.40%	17,781	2.48%

United States Senate election results for Allegheny County, Pennsylvania3
Year	Republican		Democratic		Third party(ies)	
Year	No.	%	No.	%	No.	%
1914	64,810	47.28%	28,150	20.54%	44,120	32.19%
1920	132,610	76.38%	31,450	18.11%	9,560	5.51%
1922	93,120	58.44%	51,010	32.01%	15,220	9.55%
1926	99,436	61.06%	57,090	35.05%	6,335	3.89%
1930	114,810	41.20%	150,560	54.03%	13,310	4.78%
1932	145,210	42.11%	184,316	53.45%	15,310	4.44%
1938	201,350	45.31%	238,460	53.66%	4,611	1.04%
1944	240,459	44.91%	292,840	54.69%	2,120	0.40%
1950	272,311	51.55%	251,460	47.60%	4,510	0.85%
1956	253,304	44.63%	311,940	54.96%	2,330	0.41%
1962	205,316	38.79%	321,805	60.81%	2,115	0.40%
1968	289,310	47.68%	299,101	49.29%	18,362	3.03%
1974	233,184	49.74%	224,960	47.99%	10,642	2.27%
1980	241,105	46.22%	268,114	51.39%	12,459	2.39%
1986	201,452	47.07%	224,119	52.37%	2,408	0.56%
1992	293,156	49.36%	277,191	46.68%	23,515	3.96%
1998	199,654	58.74%	125,944	37.05%	14,320	4.21%
2004	276,512	45.29%	293,641	48.10%	40,327	6.61%
2010	192,257	45.21%	232,996	54.79%	0	0.00%
2016	261,316	40.39%	357,450	55.25%	28,260	4.37%
2022	200,632	34.97%	363,873	63.42%	9,204	1.60%

=== P.A. Governor ===
- Josh Shapiro, Democratic

Pennsylvania Gubernatorial election results for Allegheny County
Year	Republican		Democratic		Third party(ies)	
Year	No.	%	No.	%	No.	%
1910	47,817	46.72%	4,350	4.25%	50,181	49.03%
1914	64,810	44.22%	31,450	21.46%	50,310	34.32%
1918	50,537	58.41%	27,328	31.59%	8,655	10.00%
1922	79,418	60.56%	43,584	33.24%	8,129	6.20%
1926	132,610	78.30%	28,150	16.62%	8,610	5.08%
1930	145,210	53.43%	111,940	41.19%	14,611	5.38%
1934	162,112	38.31%	249,211	58.89%	11,840	2.80%
1938	225,518	45.29%	266,361	53.49%	6,110	1.23%
1942	184,316	51.50%	171,112	47.81%	2,450	0.68%
1946	256,664	55.40%	202,283	43.67%	4,310	0.93%
1950	266,380	52.24%	238,460	46.76%	5,110	1.00%
1954	196,112	38.93%	305,316	60.61%	2,340	0.46%
1958	221,410	42.50%	296,459	56.90%	3,115	0.60%
1962	243,110	43.84%	309,310	55.78%	2,110	0.38%
1966	247,061	47.53%	266,361	51.24%	6,410	1.23%
1970	182,312	35.89%	308,770	60.78%	16,940	3.33%
1974	204,045	42.38%	268,636	55.79%	8,836	1.84%
1978	241,111	47.61%	258,981	51.13%	6,378	1.26%
1982	250,836	49.81%	244,391	48.53%	8,361	1.66%
1986	181,562	42.38%	242,296	56.56%	4,521	1.06%
1990	109,895	28.05%	281,883	71.95%	0	0.00%
1994	180,260	40.33%	193,459	43.28%	73,234	16.39%
1998	169,316	48.14%	127,994	36.39%	54,408	15.47%
2002	169,414	43.35%	209,708	53.66%	11,664	2.98%
2006	184,063	40.08%	275,227	59.92%	0	0.00%
2010	213,889	50.05%	213,429	49.95%	0	0.00%
2014	148,057	41.70%	207,017	58.30%	0	0.00%
2018	168,893	31.20%	364,710	67.38%	7,702	1.42%
2022	169,913	29.66%	393,386	68.68%	9,514	1.66%

=== P.A. Lieutenant Governor ===
- Austin Davis, Democratic

== Religion ==
In 2010 statistics, the largest religious group in Allegheny County was the Roman Catholic Diocese of Pittsburgh, with 460,672 Catholics worshipping at 179 parishes; followed by the United Methodist Church, with 44,204 Methodists in 100 congregations; the Presbyterian Church in the United States of America, with 42,838 Presbyterians in 145 congregations; non-denominational Protestants, with 33,103 adherents in 85 congregations; the Evangelical Lutheran Church in America, with 24,718 Lutherans in 77 congregations; the American Baptist Churches USA, with 17,148 Baptists in 42 congregations; the Assemblies of God, with 12,398 Pentecostals in 30 congregations; Reform Judaism, with 8,483 Jews in 6 congregations; the 7,780 Episcopal Church (United States), with 7,780 Episcopalians in 19 congregations; and Hinduism in the United States, with 6,700 Hindus in four temples. Altogether, 60.6% of the population was claimed as members by religious congregations, although members of historically African-American denominations were underrepresented due to incomplete information. In 2014, Allegheny County had 794 religious organizations, the 11th most out of all US counties.

== Demographics ==
Historical population
Census	Pop.	Note	%±
1790	10,203		—
1800	15,087		47.9%
1810	25,317		67.8%
1820	34,921		37.9%
1830	50,552		44.8%
1840	81,235		60.7%
1850	138,290		70.2%
1860	178,831		29.3%
1870	262,204		46.6%
1880	355,869		35.7%
1890	551,959		55.1%
1900	775,058		40.4%
1910	1,018,463		31.4%
1920	1,185,808		16.4%
1930	1,374,410		15.9%
1940	1,411,539		2.7%
1950	1,515,237		7.3%
1960	1,628,587		7.5%
1970	1,605,016		−1.4%
1980	1,450,085		−9.7%
1990	1,336,449		−7.8%
2000	1,281,666		−4.1%
2010	1,223,348		−4.6%
2020	1,250,578		2.2%
2025 (est.)	1,225,035	▼	−2.0%
U.S. Decennial Census; 1790–1960 1900–1990; 1990–2000 2010–2018

=== Racial and ethnic composition ===
Allegheny County, Pennsylvania – Racial and ethnic composition Note: the US Census treats Hispanic/Latino as an ethnic category. This table excludes Latinos from the racial categories and assigns them to a separate category. Hispanics/Latinos may be of any race.
Race / Ethnicity (NH = Non-Hispanic)	Pop 1980	Pop 1990	Pop 2000	Pop 2010	Pop 2020	% 1980	% 1990	% 2000	% 2010	% 2020
White alone (NH)	1,280,672	1,163,292	1,074,129	986,212	938,252	88.32%	87.04%	83.81%	80.62%	75.03%
Black or African American alone (NH)	149,272	148,599	158,049	159,998	161,554	10.29%	11.12%	12.33%	13.08%	12.92%
Native American or Alaska Native alone (NH)	1,003	1,320	1,427	1,426	1,305	0.07%	0.10%	0.11%	0.12%	0.10%
Asian alone (NH)	7,737	13,329	21,635	33,944	58,318	0.53%	1.00%	1.69%	2.77%	4.66%
Native Hawaiian or Pacific Islander alone (NH)	x	x	296	251	304	x	x	0.02%	0.02%	0.02%
Other race alone (NH)	3,226	1,178	2,339	2,098	6,064	0.22%	0.09%	0.18%	0.17%	0.48%
Mixed race or Multiracial (NH)	x	x	12,625	20,349	50,456	x	x	0.99%	1.66%	4.03%
Hispanic or Latino (any race)	8,175	8,731	11,166	19,070	34,325	0.56%	0.65%	0.87%	1.56%	2.74%
Total	1,450,085	1,336,449	1,281,666	1,223,348	1,250,578	100.00%	100.00%	100.00%	100.00%	100.00%

=== 2020 census ===
As of the 2020 census, the county had a population of 1,250,578. The median age was 40.2 years. 18.4% of residents were under the age of 18 and 19.4% of residents were 65 years of age or older. For every 100 females there were 94.1 males, and for every 100 females age 18 and over there were 91.8 males age 18 and over.

The racial makeup of the county was 75.7% White, 13.1% Black or African American, 0.2% American Indian and Alaska Native, 4.7% Asian, <0.1% Native Hawaiian and Pacific Islander, 1.1% from some other race, and 5.3% from two or more races. Hispanic or Latino residents of any race comprised 2.7% of the population.

97.6% of residents lived in urban areas, while 2.4% lived in rural areas.

There were 551,013 households in the county, of which 23.2% had children under the age of 18 living in them. Of all households, 40.3% were married-couple households, 21.4% were households with a male householder and no spouse or partner present, and 31.4% were households with a female householder and no spouse or partner present. About 35.7% of all households were made up of individuals and 14.2% had someone living alone who was 65 years of age or older.

There were 602,095 housing units, of which 8.5% were vacant. Among occupied housing units, 62.5% were owner-occupied and 37.5% were renter-occupied. The homeowner vacancy rate was 1.5% and the rental vacancy rate was 7.8%.

=== 2010 census ===
As of the 2010 census, there were 1,223,348 people living in the county. The population density was 1,676 people per square mile (647 people/km^{2}). The racial makeup of the county was 82.87% White, 14.39% Black or African American, 2.94% Asian, 0.03% Pacific Islander, 0.37% from other races, and 1.40% from two or more races. About 1.31% of the population were Hispanic or Latino of any race.

=== 2000 census ===
At the 2000 census, there were 1,281,666 people, 537,150 households, and 332,495 families living in the county. The population density was 1,755 people per square mile (678 people/km^{2}). There were 583,646 housing units at an average density of 799 per square mile (308/km^{2}). The racial makeup of the county was 84.33% White, 12.41% Black or African American, 0.12% Native American, 1.69% Asian, 0.03% Pacific Islander, 0.34% from other races, and 1.07% from two or more races. About 0.87% of the population were Hispanic or Latino of any race. 20.0% were of German, 15.0% Italian, 12.7% Irish, 7.5% Polish and 5.1% English ancestry. 93.5% spoke English and 1.3% Spanish as their first language.

There were 537,150 households, out of which 26.40% had children under the age of 18 living with them, 46.10% were married couples living together, 12.40% had a female householder with no husband present, and 38.10% were non-families. Some 32.70% of all households were made up of individuals, and 13.20% had someone living alone who was 65 years of age or older. The average household size was 2.31 and the average family size was 2.96.

The age distribution of the population shows 21.90% under the age of 18, 8.50% from 18 to 24, 28.30% from 25 to 44, 23.40% from 45 to 64, and 17.80% who were 65 years of age or older. The median age was 40. For every 100 females, there were 90.00 males; for every 100 females age 18 and over, there were 86.20 males.

== Economy ==
In the late 18th century, farming played a critical role in the growth of the area. There was a surplus of grain due to transportation difficulties in linking with the eastern portion of the state. As a result, the farmers distilled the grain into whiskey, which significantly helped the farmers financially.

Employment by occupation in Allegheny County

The area quickly became a key manufacturing area in the young nation. Coupled with deposits of iron and coal, and the easy access to waterways for barge traffic, the city quickly became one of the most important steel producing areas in the world. Based on 2007 data from the US Army Corps of Engineers, Pittsburgh is the second (after Laredo, Texas) busiest inland port in the nation.

US steel production declined late in the 20th century, and Allegheny County's economy began a shift to other industries. It is presently known for its hospitals, universities, and industrial centers. Despite the decline of heavy industry, Pittsburgh is home to a number of major companies and is ranked in the top ten among US cities hosting headquarters of Fortune 500 corporations, including U.S. Steel Corporation, PNC Financial Services Group, PPG Industries, and H. J. Heinz Company.

The county leads the state in number of defense contractors supplying the U.S. military.

== Regions ==
- East Hills
- North Hills
- South Hills
- West Hills
- City of Pittsburgh

== Education ==
=== Colleges and universities ===
- Byzantine Catholic Seminary of SS. Cyril and Methodius
- Carlow University
- Carnegie Mellon University
- Chatham University
- DeVry University
- Duquesne University
- La Roche University
- Penn State Greater Allegheny
- Pittsburgh Theological Seminary
- Point Park University
- Reformed Presbyterian Theological Seminary
- Robert Morris University
- University of Pittsburgh

=== Community, junior and technical colleges ===
- Bidwell Training Center
- Community College of Allegheny County
- Empire Beauty Schools
- Fountain of Youth Academy of Cosmetology
- Institute of Medical and Business Careers
- North Hills Beauty Academy
- Pittsburgh Career Institute
- Pittsburgh Institute of Aeronautics
- Pittsburgh Institute of Mortuary Science
- Pittsburgh Multicultural Cosmetology Academy
- Pittsburgh Technical College
- Rosedale Technical College
- South Hills Beauty Academy
- Triangle Tech
- Vet Tech Institute

=== Public school districts ===
Map of Allegheny County, Pennsylvania Public School Districts

School districts include:

- Allegheny Valley School District
- Avonworth School District
- Baldwin-Whitehall School District
- Bethel Park School District
- Brentwood Borough School District
- Carlynton School District
- Chartiers Valley School District
- Clairton City School District
- Cornell School District
- Deer Lakes School District
- Duquesne City School District
- East Allegheny School District
- Elizabeth Forward School District
- Fort Cherry School District (part)
- Fox Chapel Area School District
- Gateway School District
- Hampton Township School District
- Highlands School District
- Keystone Oaks School District
- McKeesport Area School District
- Montour School District
- Moon Area School District
- Mount Lebanon School District
- North Allegheny School District
- North Hills School District
- Northgate School District
- Norwin School District
- Penn Hills School District
- Penn-Trafford School District (part)
- Pine-Richland School District
- Pittsburgh School District
- Plum Borough School District
- Quaker Valley School District
- Riverview School District
- Shaler Area School District
- South Allegheny School District
- South Fayette Township School District
- South Park School District
- Steel Valley School District
- Sto-Rox School District
- Upper St. Clair School District
- West Allegheny School District
- West Jefferson Hills School District
- West Mifflin Area School District
- Wilkinsburg School District
- Woodland Hills School District

=== Approved private schools ===
These private schools provide special education for disabled students:

- ACLD Tillotson School, Pittsburgh
- The Day School at The Children's Institute, Pittsburgh
- DePaul School for Hearing and Speech, Pittsburgh
- Easter Seal Society of Western Pennsylvania
- The Education Center at the Watson Institute, Sewickley
- Pace School, Pittsburgh
- Pressley Ridge Day School, Pittsburgh
- Pressley Ridge School for the Deaf, Pittsburgh
- The Watson Institute Friendship Academy, Pittsburgh
- Wesley Spectrum Highland Services, Pittsburgh
- Western Pennsylvania School for Blind Children, Pittsburgh
- Western Pennsylvania School for the Deaf, Pittsburgh

=== Private high schools ===
- Bishop Canevin High School
- Central Catholic High School
- Cornerstone Christian Preparatory Academy
- Eden Christian Academy
- The Ellis School
- Hillcrest Christian Academy
- Harvest Baptist Academy
- Imani Christian Academy
- Oakland Catholic High School
- Our Lady of the Sacred Heart High School
- Serra Catholic High School
- Seton-La Salle Catholic High School
- Sewickley Academy
- Shady Side Academy
- St. Joseph High School
- Vincentian Academy
- Winchester Thurston School

== Transportation ==
Allegheny County's public transportation provider is Pittsburgh Regional Transit. The Allegheny County Department of Public Works oversees infrastructure, maintenance, and engineering services in the county.

The Three Rivers Heritage Trail provides uninterrupted bicycle and pedestrian connections along the three rivers in the city, and the Great Allegheny Passage trail runs from downtown Pittsburgh to Washington, D.C.

The Allegheny County Airport is the original airport for Pittsburgh and houses a number of flight schools, charter flight operations, and medevac operations. It is owned and operated by The Allegheny County Airport Authority.

Pittsburgh International Airport is the major passenger airport for the county with service to many destinations on several airlines. Like the Allegheny County Airport, it is also owned and operated by The Allegheny County Airport Authority.

=== Major roadways ===
- Interstate 79 runs north to south from Warrendale to Bridgeville
- Interstate 279 runs north to south from Franklin Park to Downtown
- Interstate 579 (Crosstown Boulevard), from Interstate 279 on the north shore to Liberty Bridge / Boulevard of the Allies
- Interstate 76 / PA Turnpike runs east to west from Interstate 376 in Monroeville to the Warrendale interchange (at Interstate 79)
- Interstate 376 runs east to west from Interstate 76 in Monroeville across the county to Pittsburgh International Airport and beyond
- Pennsylvania Turnpike 576 (future I-576) runs south from Interstate 376 at the Pittsburgh International Airport to US Route 22, also called the Findlay Connector. The next phase of this road extension, from US Route 22 to Interstate 79 running along the County line, is currently under construction and is expected to be open to traffic in 2020.
- US Route 19 runs north to south from Warrendale to Upper St. Clair
- US Route 22 runs west to east, along much of US Route 30 and Interstate 376, from Imperial to Monroeville
- US Route 30 runs west to east from Clinton to North Versailles, joining US 22 and Interstate 376 south of the Pittsburgh International Airport and leaving those same two routes in Wilkinsburg

For information about major state roads, see list of state routes in Allegheny County, Pennsylvania and Allegheny County Belt System.

== Parks and recreation ==
There are two Pennsylvania state parks located within Allegheny County. Point State Park occupies the confluence of the Allegheny and Monongahela rivers in Downtown Pittsburgh, while Allegheny Islands State Park consists of islands in the Allegheny River near Harmar Township, undeveloped as of August 2010.

The county is also home to Pennsylvania State Game Lands Number 203, which provides opportunities for hunting and other outdoor activities.

The Allegheny Land Trust, a regional land conservation organization based in Sewickley, has acquired and preserved parcels of land throughout the county for use as scenic and recreational green space. In 2012, the trust pursued the purchase of land formerly owned by the Pittsburgh Cut Flower Company in Richland Township. In 2020, it received a grant to convert the former Churchill Valley Country Club into public green space. Later that year, it donated 20 undeveloped acres across three parcels in Hampton to expand North Park.

A 2025 economic impact study commissioned by the Allegheny County Parks Foundation found that the county's nine regional parks, including North Park and South Park, collectively support tourism, raise surrounding property values, and provide environmental benefits such as carbon storage and urban tree canopy, generating millions of dollars in value annually.

== Sports ==
- Pittsburgh Steelers, football team
- Pittsburgh Penguins, ice hockey team
- Pittsburgh Pirates, baseball team
- Pittsburgh Riverhounds, soccer team
- Pittsburgh Passion, Women's Football Alliance team
- Pittsburgh Thunderbirds, American Ultimate Disc League team
- Steel City Roller Derby, Women's Flat Track Derby Association team

== Communities ==
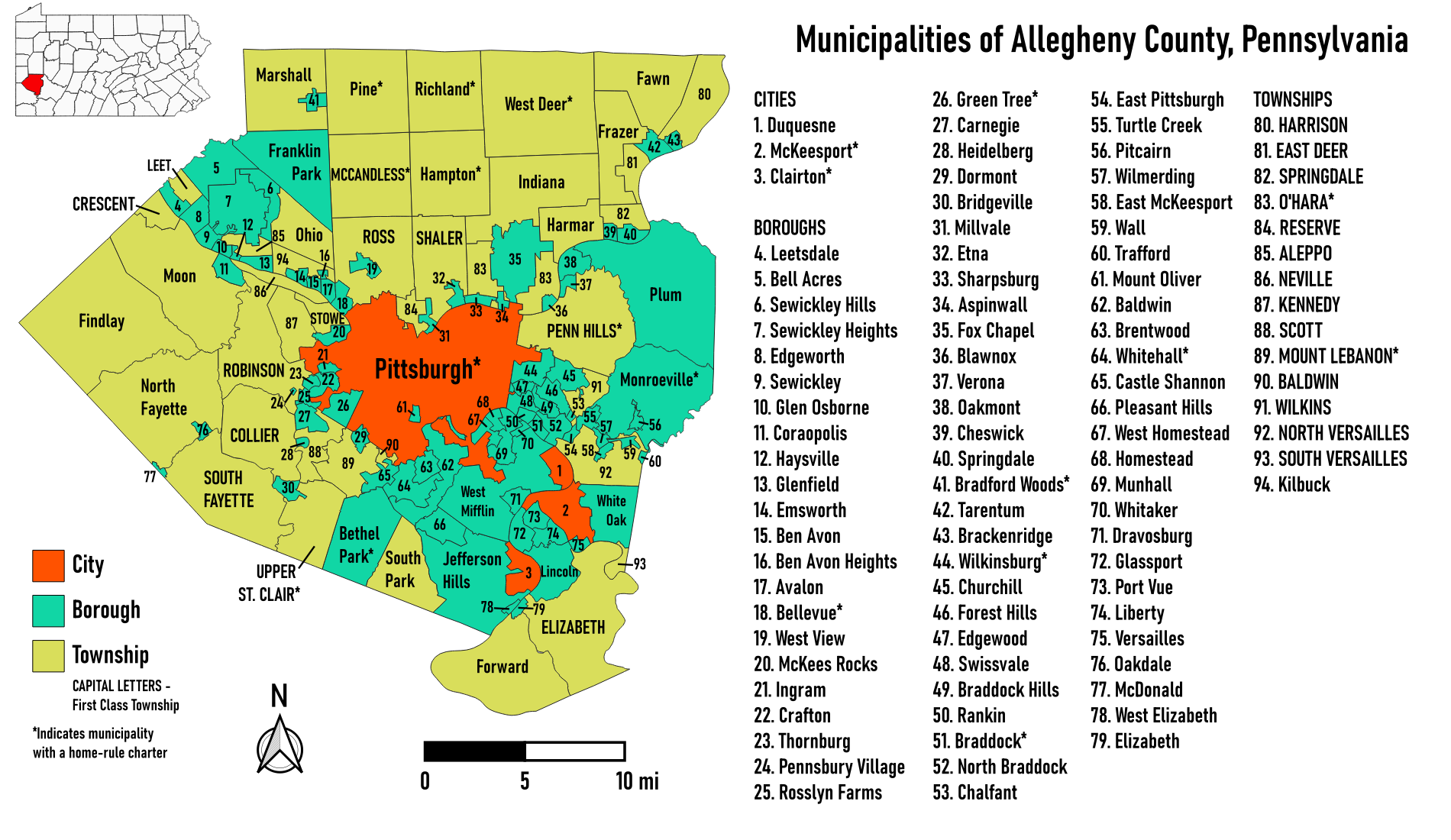
Map of municipalities in Allegheny County

Under Pennsylvania law, there are four types of incorporated municipalities: cities, boroughs, townships, and (in a case) a town. The following municipalities are in Allegheny County:

=== Cities ===
- Clairton
- Duquesne
- McKeesport
- Pittsburgh (county seat)

=== Boroughs ===
- Aspinwall
- Avalon
- Baldwin
- Bell Acres
- Bellevue
- Ben Avon
- Ben Avon Heights
- Bethel Park
- Blawnox
- Brackenridge
- Braddock
- Braddock Hills
- Bradford Woods
- Brentwood
- Bridgeville
- Carnegie
- Castle Shannon
- Chalfant
- Cheswick
- Churchill
- Coraopolis
- Crafton
- Dormont
- Dravosburg
- East McKeesport
- East Pittsburgh
- Edgewood
- Edgeworth
- Elizabeth
- Emsworth
- Etna
- Forest Hills
- Fox Chapel
- Franklin Park
- Glassport
- Glenfield
- Glen Osborne
- Green Tree
- Haysville
- Heidelberg
- Homestead
- Ingram
- Jefferson Hills
- Leetsdale
- Liberty
- Lincoln
- McDonald (mostly in Washington County)
- McKees Rocks
- Millvale
- Monroeville
- Mount Oliver
- Munhall
- North Braddock
- Oakdale
- Oakmont
- Pennsbury Village
- Pitcairn
- Pleasant Hills
- Plum
- Port Vue
- Rankin
- Rosslyn Farms
- Sewickley
- Sewickley Heights
- Sewickley Hills
- Sharpsburg
- Springdale
- Swissvale
- Tarentum
- Thornburg
- Trafford (mostly in Westmoreland County)
- Turtle Creek
- Verona
- Versailles
- Wall
- West Elizabeth
- West Homestead
- West Mifflin
- West View
- Whitaker
- White Oak
- Whitehall
- Wilkinsburg
- Wilmerding

=== Townships ===
- Aleppo
- Baldwin
- Collier
- Crescent
- East Deer
- Elizabeth
- Fawn
- Findlay
- Forward
- Frazer
- Hampton
- Harmar
- Harrison
- Indiana
- Kennedy
- Kilbuck
- Leet
- Marshall
- McCandless
- Moon
- Mt. Lebanon
- Neville
- North Fayette
- North Versailles
- O'Hara
- Ohio
- Penn Hills
- Pine
- Reserve
- Richland
- Robinson
- Ross
- Scott
- Shaler
- South Fayette
- South Park
- South Versailles
- Springdale
- Stowe
- Upper Saint Clair
- West Deer
- Wilkins

=== Census-designated places ===
Census-designated places are geographical areas designated by the US Census Bureau for the purposes of compiling demographic data. They are not actual jurisdictions under Pennsylvania law. Other unincorporated communities, such as villages, may be listed here as well.

- Allison Park
- Bairdford
- Bakerstown
- Boston
- Carnot-Moon
- Clinton
- Curtisville
- Enlow
- Gibsonia
- Glenshaw
- Greenock
- Harwick
- Imperial
- Noblestown
- Rennerdale
- Russellton
- Sturgeon

=== Unincorporated communities ===
- Acmetonia
- Blackridge
- Blanchard
- Broughton
- Bruceton
- Buena Vista
- Creighton
- Cubbage Hill
- Cuddy
- Dorseyville
- Ewingsville
- Harmarville
- Indianola
- Ingomar
- Karns
- Keown Station
- Kirwan Heights
- Library
- McKnight
- Moon Run
- Mount Vernon
- Natrona
- Natrona Heights
- Nevillewood
- Presto
- Regent Square
- Rural Ridge
- Sheraden
- Warrendale
- Wexford
- Wildwood

=== Former places ===
Many political subdivisions of Allegheny County have come and gone through subdivision or annexation through the years. These include:

- Allegheny City – the area that is now the North Shore (or North Side) of the City of Pittsburgh, north of the Allegheny River.
- Allentown Borough – now the neighborhood of Allentown in Pittsburgh.
- Birmingham Borough – what is now Pittsburgh's South Side.
- Brushton Borough
- Carrick Borough – now the neighborhood of Carrick. Formed out of Baldwin Township in 1904, this borough existed until it was annexed by Pittsburgh in 1927. It was named for Carrick-on-Suir, Ireland. Some of the area's manhole covers still bear the Carrick Borough name.
- Chartier Township – existed at the time of the 1860 U.S. Federal Census.
- Collins Township – in what is now the northeast part of the City of Pittsburgh, east of Lawrenceville and north of Penn Avenue.
- Knoxville Borough
- Lawrenceville Borough
- McClure Township – McClure was formed in 1858 from the section of Ross Township adjacent to Allegheny City. In 1867 McClure, along with sections of Reserve Township, was incorporated into Allegheny City. The McClure section of this annexation became Wards 9 (Woods Run Area) and 11 (present-day Brighton Heights) in the City of Pittsburgh.
- Mifflin Township- comprised the modern day communities of Whitaker, West Mifflin, West Homestead, West Elizabeth, Pleasant Hills, Munhall, Lincoln Place, Jefferson Hills, Homestead, Hays, Duquesne, Dravosburg, Clairton and part of Baldwin.
- Patton Township – was in the east-central part of the county, north of North Versailles Township, east of Wilkins and Penn Townships, and south of Plum Township. In the U.S. census for 1860–1880. In 1951 it became incorporated as the borough of Monroeville.
- Northern Liberties Borough – in what is now the Strip District of Pittsburgh. The borough was annexed to Pittsburgh in 1837 as the first addition to the city's original territory.
- Peebles Township – included most of what is now the eastern part of the city of Pittsburgh from the Monongahela River in the south (today's Hazelwood) to the Allegheny River in the north. It was subdivided into Collins and Liberty townships, all of which were incorporated into Pittsburgh in 1868.
- Pitt Township
- St. Clair Township – stretched from the Monongahela River south to the Washington County line. It divided into Lower St. Clair, which eventually became part of the City of Pittsburgh, Dormont, Mount Lebanon, and Upper St. Clair.
- Snowden – now known as South Park Township.
- Sterrett Township
- Temperanceville – what is now Pittsburgh's West End.
- Union Borough – the area surrounding Temperanceville.
- West Liberty Borough – now the neighborhoods of Brookline and Beechview in Pittsburgh.

=== Population ranking ===
The population ranking of the following table is based on the 2010 census of Allegheny County.

† county seat

Rank	City/Town/etc.	Population (2010 Census)	Municipal type	Incorporated
1	† Pittsburgh	305,704	City	1794 (borough) 1816 (city)
2	Penn Hills	42,329	Municipality	1851 (Penn Twp.) 1958 (Penn Hills Twp.) 1976 (municipality)
3	Mt. Lebanon	33,137	Municipality	1912 (township) 1975 (municipality)
4	Bethel Park	32,313	Municipality	1949 (borough) 1978 (municipality)
5	Ross	31,105	Municipality	1809
6	Monroeville	28,386	Municipality	1951
7	Plum	27,126	Borough	1788 (township) 1956 (borough)
8	Allison Park	21,552	CDP	
9	West Mifflin	20,313	Borough	1942
10	Baldwin	19,767	Borough	1950
11	McKeesport	19,731	City	1842 (borough) 1891 (city)
12	Wilkinsburg	15,930	Borough	1871 (Sterrett Twp.) 1887 (borough)
13	Whitehall	13,944	Borough	1948
14	Franklin Park	13,470	Borough	1823
15	South Park	13,416	Township	1931
16	Munhall	11,406	Borough	
17	Carnot-Moon	11,372	CDP	
18	Jefferson Hills	10,619	Borough	
19	North Versailles	10,229	Township	1869
20	Brentwood	9,643	Borough	1916
21	Swissvale	8,983	Borough	
22	Glenshaw	8,981	CDP	
23	Dormont	8,593	Borough	1909
24	Bellevue	8,370	Borough	1867
25	Castle Shannon	8,316	Borough	1919
26	Pleasant Hills	8,268	Borough	
27	Carnegie	7,972	Borough	1894
28	White Oak	7,862	Borough	
29	Clairton	6,796	City	1903 (borough) 1922 (city)
30	West View	6,771	Borough	
31	Forest Hills	6,518	Borough	1919
32	Oakmont	6,303	Borough	1889
33	McKees Rocks	6,104	Borough	1892
34	Crafton	5,951	Borough	
35	Coraopolis	5,677	Borough	1886
36	Duquesne	5,565	City	1891 (borough) 1918 (city)
37	Fox Chapel	5,388	Borough	
38	Turtle Creek	5,349	Borough	
39	Bridgeville	5,148	Borough	1901
40	North Braddock	4,857	Borough	
41	Avalon	4,705	Borough	1874
42	Tarentum	4,530	Borough	1842
43	Glassport	4,483	Borough	
44	Green Tree	4,432	Borough	1885
45	Sewickley	3,827	Borough	
46	Port Vue	3,798	Borough	
47	Millvale	3,744	Borough	
48	Pitcairn	3,689	Borough	
49	Etna	3,451	Borough	
50	Sharpsburg	3,446	Borough	
51	Springdale	3,405	Borough	
52	Mount Oliver	3,403	Borough	
53	Ingram	3,330	Borough	
54	Brackenridge	3,260	Borough	1901
55	Trafford (mostly in Westmoreland County)	3,174	Borough	1904
56	Homestead	3,165	Borough	
57	Edgewood	3,118	Borough	1888
58	Churchill	3,011	Borough	
59	Aspinwall	2,801	Borough	1892
60	Gibsonia	2,733	CDP	
61	Liberty	2,551	Borough	
62	Imperial	2,541	CDP	
63	Verona	2,474	Borough	1871
64	Emsworth	2,449	Borough	
65	Greenock	2,195	CDP	
66	Wilmerding	2,190	Borough	
67	Braddock	2,159	Borough	1867
68	McDonald (mostly in Washington County)	2,149	Borough	1889
69	East McKeesport	2,126	Borough	
70	Rankin	2,122	Borough	
71	West Homestead	1,929	Borough	
72	Braddock Hills	1,880	Borough	1946
73	East Pittsburgh	1,822	Borough	
74	Dravosburg	1,792	Borough	
75	Ben Avon	1,781	Borough	1891
76	Bakerstown	1,761	CDP	
77	Cheswick	1,746	Borough	
78	Sturgeon	1,710	CDP	
79	Edgeworth	1,680	Borough	
80	Versailles	1,515	Borough	
81	Elizabeth	1,493	Borough	
82	Oakdale	1,459	Borough	
83	Russellton	1,440	CDP	
84	Blawnox	1,432	Borough	1925
85	Bell Acres	1,388	Borough	1960
86	Whitaker	1,271	Borough	
87	Heidelberg	1,244	Borough	
88	Leetsdale	1,218	Borough	
89	Bradford Woods	1,171	Borough	1915
90	Rennerdale	1,150	CDP	
91	Lincoln	1,072	Borough	
92	Curtisville	1,064	CDP	
93	Enlow	1,013	CDP	
94	Harwick	899	CDP	
95	Sewickley Heights	810	Borough	
96	Chalfant	800	Borough	
97	Bairdford	698	CDP	
98	Pennsbury Village	661	Borough	
99	Sewickley Hills	639	Borough	
100	Wall	580	Borough	
101	Noblestown	575	CDP	
102	Glen Osborne	547	Borough	
103	Boston	545	CDP	
104	West Elizabeth	518	Borough	
105	Thornburg	455	Borough	
106	Clinton	434	CDP	
107	Rosslyn Farms	427	Borough	
108	Ben Avon Heights	371	Borough	1913
109	Glenfield	205	Borough	
110	Haysville	70	Borough	

== See also ==
- List of Pennsylvania state historical markers in Allegheny County
- National Register of Historic Places listings in Allegheny County, Pennsylvania
- List of counties in Pennsylvania
