= East Deer Township, Pennsylvania =

Township in Pennsylvania, US

- Township
- Logo
- Interactive map of East Deer Township, Pennsylvania
- Location within Pennsylvania Location within the United States
- Coordinates: 40°35′25″N 79°47′5″W
- Country: United States
- State: Pennsylvania
- County: Allegheny

Population
  - Total: 1,490
- ZIP codes: 15030, 15084
- Website: eastdeertownship.org

East Deer Township is a township in Allegheny County, Pennsylvania, United States. The population was 1,490 at the 2020 census.

== Geography ==
According to the United States Census Bureau, the township has a total area of 2.6 square miles (6.7 km^{2}), of which 2.3 square miles (6.0 km^{2}) is land and 0.3 square miles (0.78 km^{2}), or 11.83%, is water.

== Surrounding neighborhoods ==
East Deer Township has three land borders, including Frazer to the north, south and west, Tarentum to the northeast, and a very small border with Springdale Township to the south-southeast along the Allegheny River. Across the river in Westmoreland County, East Deer runs adjacent with Arnold.

== Government and politics ==
Presidential elections results
Year	Republican	Democratic	Third parties
2020	55% 396	43% 316	0.9% 7
2016	53% 311	46% 270	1% 10
2012	48% 282	50% 296	2% 9

== Demographics ==
Historical population
Census	Pop.	Note	%±
1970	2,081		—
1980	1,658		−20.3%
1990	1,558		−6.0%
2000	1,362		−12.6%
2010	1,500		10.1%
2020	1,490		−0.7%
2024 (est.)	1,433		−3.8%
U.S. Decennial Census

At the 2000 census, there were 1,362 people, 606 households, and 350 families living in the township. The population density was 590.3 inhabitants per square mile (227.9/km^{2}). There were 682 housing units at an average density of 295.6 per square mile (114.1/km^{2}). The racial makeup of the township was 96.84% White, 1.91% African American, 0.15% Asian, 0.07% from other races, and 1.03% from two or more races. Hispanic or Latino of any race were 0.07%.

East Deer residents reported 19% being of German ancestry, 19% of Italian ancestry, 13% Irish ancestry, 11% Polish ancestry and 10% Slovak ancestry in 2000.

There were 606 households, 23.4% had children under the age of 18 living with them, 41.4% were married couples living together, 12.0% had a female householder with no husband present, and 42.2% were non-families. 37.1% of households were made up of individuals, and 16.5% were one person aged 65 or older. The average household size was 2.16 and the average family size was 2.82.

The age distribution was 18.8% under the age of 18, 7.0% from 18 to 24, 32.5% from 25 to 44, 18.4% from 45 to 64, and 23.3% 65 or older. The median age was 41 years. For every 100 females there were 81.8 males. For every 100 females age 18 and over, there were 77.2 males.

The median household income was $30,078 and the median family income was $38,839. Males had a median income of $28,894 versus $24,792 for females. The per capita income for the township was $17,108. About 5.4% of families and 7.9% of the population were below the poverty line, including 6.5% of those under age 18 and 8.0% of those age 65 or over.
