= Harwick, Pennsylvania =

Unincorporated community in Pennsylvania, US

- Census-designated place
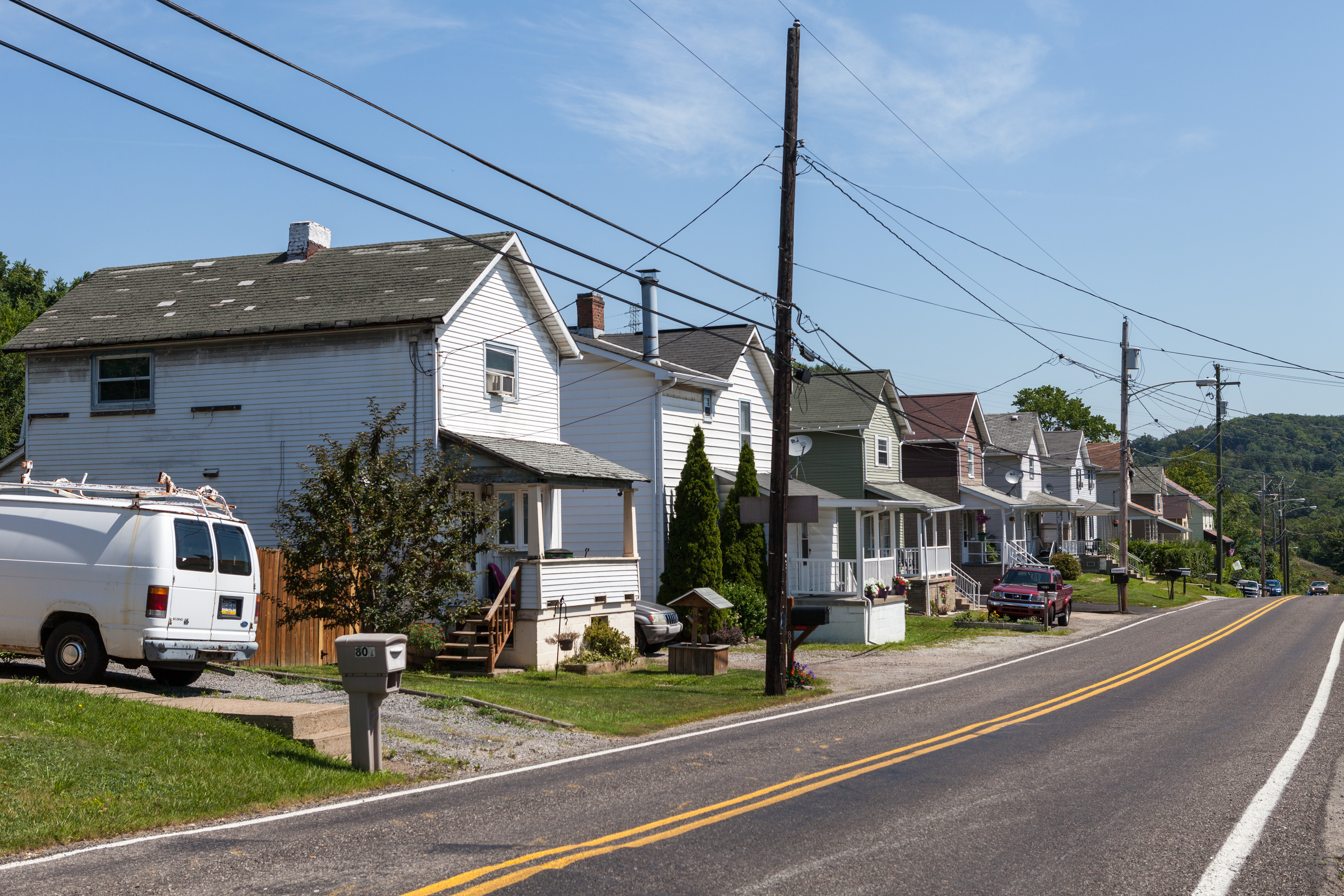
- Looking east at the north side of Jacoby Road in Harwick, Springdale Township, Pennsylvania, at the intersection with Pillow Street

- Location in Allegheny County and state of Pennsylvania
- Coordinates: 40°33′22″N 79°48′19″W
- Country: United States
- State: Pennsylvania
- County: Allegheny
- Township: Springdale

Area
  - Total: 0.44 sq mi (1.14 km^{2})
  - Land: 0.44 sq mi (1.14 km^{2})
  - Water: 0 sq mi (0.00 km^{2})

Population (2020)
  - Total: 850
  - Density: 1,923.4/sq mi (742.62/km^{2})
- Time zone: UTC-5 (Eastern (EST))
  - Summer (DST): UTC-4 (EDT)
- ZIP code: 15049
- Area code: 724
- FIPS code: 42-33024

Harwick is a census-designated place (CDP) in Allegheny County, Pennsylvania, United States, and is located within Springdale Township. As of the 2020 census, it had a population of 850.

== Demographics ==
Historical population
Census	Pop.	Note	%±
2010	899		—
2020	850		−5.5%
U.S. Decennial Census
