= Blanchard, Allegheny County, Pennsylvania =

Unincorporated community in Pennsylvania, US

- Unincorporated community
- Location within the state of Pennsylvania Blanchard (the United States)
- Coordinates: 40°39′26″N 79°49′42″W
- Country: United States
- State: Pennsylvania
- County: Allegheny
- Township: West Deer
- Elevation: 1,129 ft (344 m)
- Time zone: UTC-5 (Eastern (EST))
  - Summer (DST): UTC-4 (EDT)
- GNIS feature ID: 1169807

Blanchard is an unincorporated community and coal town in West Deer Township, Allegheny County, Pennsylvania, United States. It lies at an elevation of 1129 feet (344 m).
