= Monongahela Wharf =

Wharf in Pittsburgh, Pennsylvania, USA

Coordinates: 40.43745°N 80.00421°W

The Monongahela Wharf was the key wharf of Pittsburgh, Pennsylvania, United States, on the Monongahela River. It was in use from the late 19th century until the dam was built in the Ohio river, causing it to be underwater.

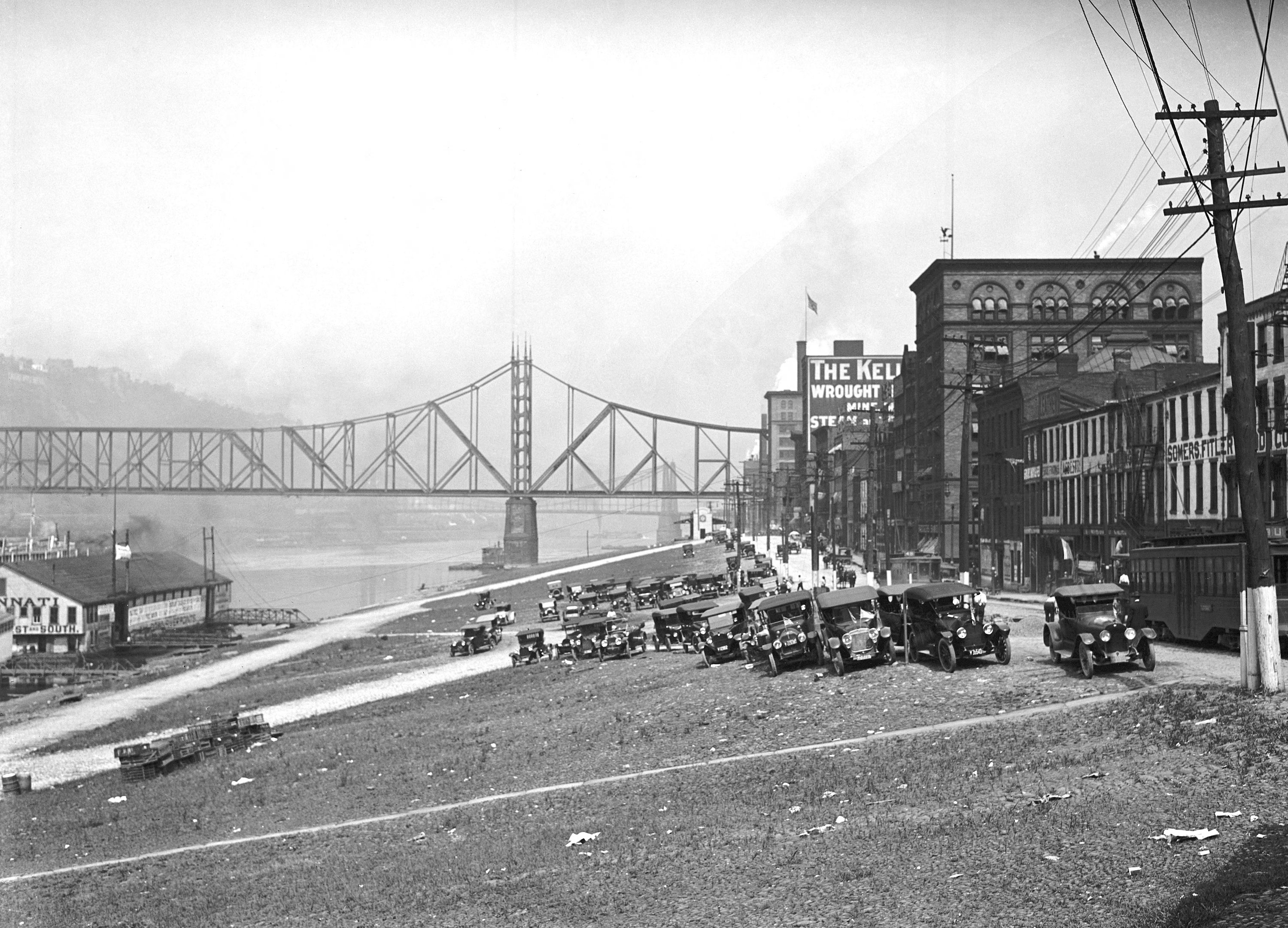
Monongahela Wharf in 1917

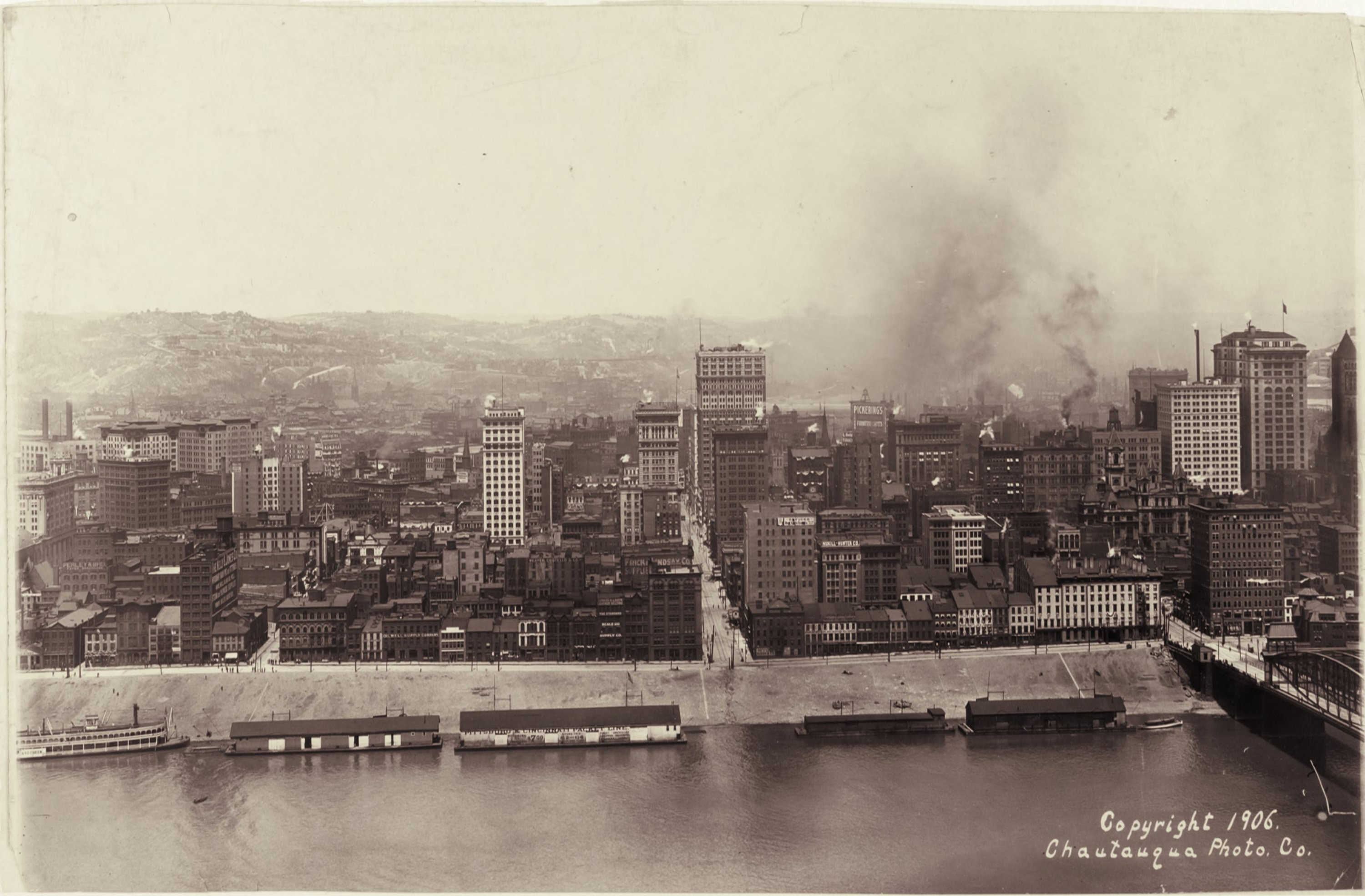
Monongahela Wharf, aerial view in 1906

It was used by steamboats/steamers, tugboats, riverboats, and the Gateway Clipper Fleet.

== Overview ==
Monongahela Wharf lay between the piers of the Wabash Bridge and the Smithfield Street Bridge on the north side of the river, now called the Firstside Historic District. Most of the businesses near the wharf dealt in supply and delivery. The wharf was also used as a parking lot later, when the use of cars was common.

The Monogahela Wharf was the commercial hub for the city of Pittsburgh. One of the first bridges in Pittsburgh, the Wabash Bridge, later part of the Pittsburgh and West Virginia Railway, was built near the Wharf in the early 20th century.
