= Pitt Township, Allegheny County, Pennsylvania =

Former township in Allegheny County, Pennsylvania

Coordinates: 40°27′N 79°58′W

Pitt Township was one of the original townships created with the formation of Allegheny County, Pennsylvania, in 1788. It repeatedly diminished in size until dissolving into the city of Pittsburgh in 1868.

== History ==
When Allegheny County was created in 1788, its territory extended to the north and west state lines. It was divided into seven townships, of which Pitt Township was by far the largest in area as it included all of the vast part of the county north of the Ohio River and west of the Allegheny River. The rest of Pitt Township lay between the Allegheny and Monongahela rivers, from their confluence at Pittsburgh (then an unincorporated village within the township) to Turtle Creek on the Monongahela and Plum Creek on the Allegheny.

Pitt Township lost Pittsburgh to the creation of Pittsburgh Township in 1792. (Note: Pittsburgh Township existed only briefly, with part of it becoming the borough of Pittsburgh (1794) and the rest apparently returning to Pitt Township.) In 1795 and 1796, the county reorganized the immense portion of Pitt Township north of the Ohio and Allegheny rivers into new townships. Thereafter, Pitt Township was confined to the wedge between the Allegheny and Monongahela rivers. Its territory was further dismembered by the creation of Wilkins Township (1821), Northern Liberties borough (1829), Peebles Township (1833), the sixth through ninth wards of Pittsburgh (1845–1846), and Oakland Township (1866). The final remnant of Pitt Township, bordering north of Oakland, was annexed by Pittsburgh in 1868.

There had been an earlier Pitt Township in southwestern Pennsylvania prior to the creation of Allegheny County. Formed in 1771 as part of Bedford County, it was originally bounded on the north by the Ohio and Allegheny rivers and on the south by a line drawn due west from the mouth of Redstone Creek.
