= Fox Chapel, Pennsylvania =

Borough in Pennsylvania, US

- Borough
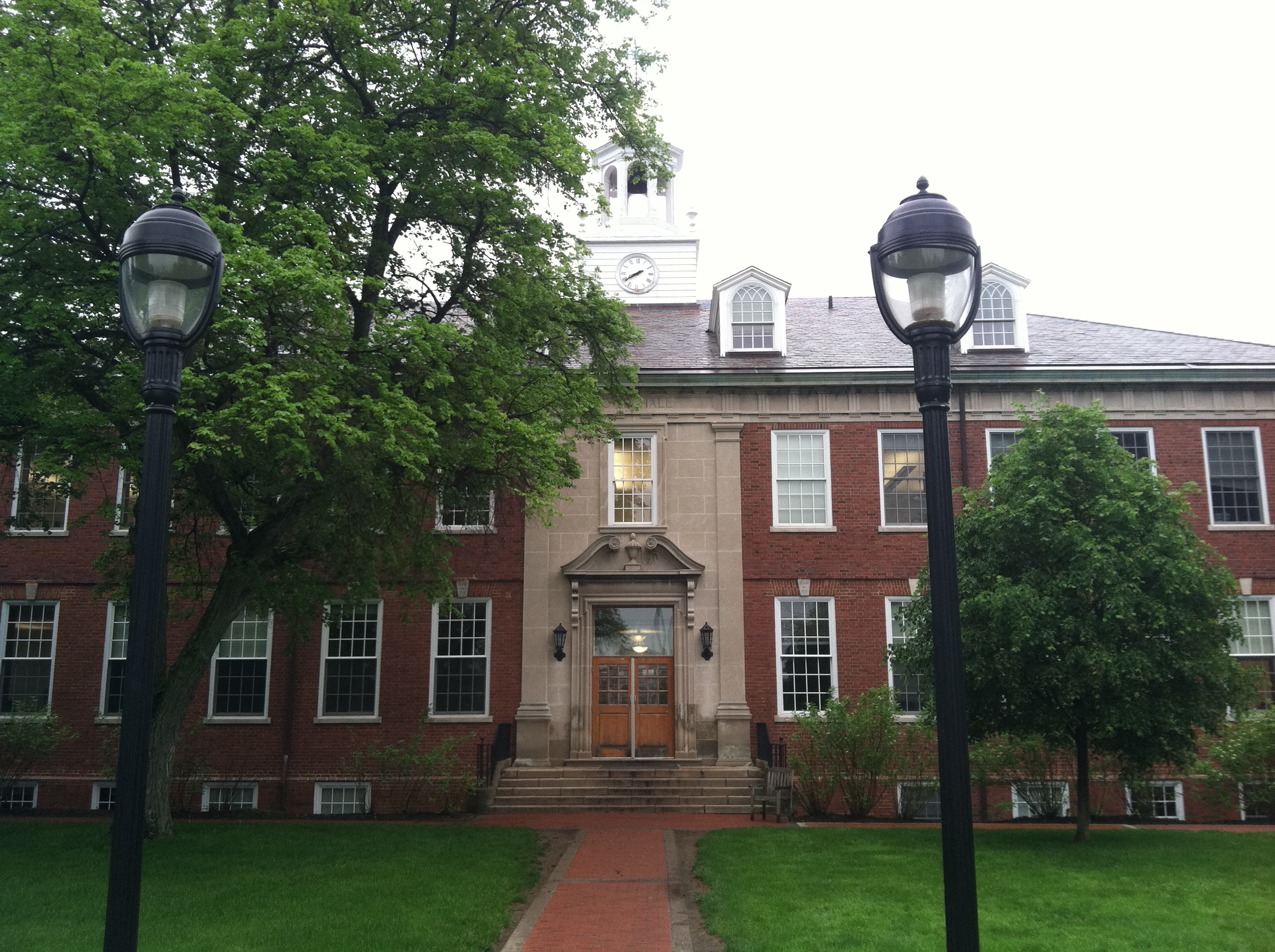
- Shady Side Academy upper school campus
- Interactive map of Fox Chapel, Pennsylvania
- Location within Pennsylvania Location within the United States
- Coordinates: 40°30′46″N 79°53′35″W
- Country: United States
- State: Pennsylvania
- County: Allegheny

Government
  - Mayor: Walter Scott, III (R)

Area
  - Total: 7.88 sq mi (20.40 km^{2})
  - Land: 7.87 sq mi (20.38 km^{2})
  - Water: 0.0077 sq mi (0.02 km^{2})

Population (2020)
  - Total: 5,343
  - Density: 679.1/sq mi (262.21/km^{2})
- Time zone: UTC-5 (Eastern (EST))
  - Summer (DST): UTC-4 (EDT)
- ZIP Codes: 15215 and 15238
- Area code: 412
- FIPS code: 42-27120
- Website: www.fox-chapel.pa.us

Fox Chapel is a borough in Allegheny County, Pennsylvania, United States. It is a suburb of Pittsburgh located 6 miles (10 km) northeast of downtown. The population was 5,343 as of the 2020 census.

== History ==
In the 1750s, the Seneca Indians lived in the region. Until the late 18th century, American Indian tribes hunted and fished in the general Fox Chapel area. Virginia and Pennsylvania both claimed the territory. The dispute was not resolved until after the Revolutionary War. Today, less than 1% of its population is Native American.

The first white settler in the area was James Powers, who arrived around 1790. The first schoolhouse was on Squaw Run, where it stood in 1806. It was a log house. A church was organized in 1818 on Kittanning Road, on a branch of Pine Creek. The Pittsburgh Field Club, which was established in 1882, moved to present-day Fox Chapel in 1915, and the Fox Chapel Golf Club opened in 1919. Shady Side Academy opened its senior school on property that was formerly two large farms, a gift from prominent Pittsburgh industrialist Wallace H. Rowe, in 1922. A nearby private estate, built in 1928 by steel industrialist James E. Lewis, became the academy's standalone middle school campus in 1958.

== Geography ==
Fox Chapel has six borders, including Indiana Township to the north, Harmar Township to the northeast, three of the five non-contiguous areas of O'Hara Township to the east, southeast, west and southwest, and the Pittsburgh neighborhood of Lincoln–Lemington–Belmar to the south.

According to the United States Census Bureau, the borough has a total area of 7.8 square miles (20 km^{2}), of which 0.13% is water.

== Demographics ==
Historical population
| Census | Pop. | Note | %± |
|---|---|---|---|
| 1940 | 1,080 | | — |
| 1950 | 1,721 | | 59.4% |
| 1960 | 3,302 | | 91.9% |
| 1970 | 4,684 | | 41.9% |
| 1980 | 5,049 | | 7.8% |
| 1990 | 5,319 | | 5.3% |
| 2000 | 5,436 | | 2.2% |
| 2010 | 5,388 | | −0.9% |
| 2020 | 5,343 | | −0.8% |

As of the 2000 census, there were 5,436 people, 1,875 households, and 1,599 families residing in the borough. The population density was 693.9 people per square mile (267.9 people/km^{2}). There were 1,942 housing units at an average density of 247.9 per square mile (95.7/km^{2}). The racial makeup of the borough was 93.29% White, 0.55% African American, 0.02% Native American, 5.22% Asian, 0.04% Pacific Islander, 0.13% from other races, and 0.75% from two or more races. Hispanic or Latino of any race were 0.68% of the population.

There were 1,875 households, out of which 41.7% had children under the age of 18 living with them, 79.9% were married couples living together, 3.7% had a female householder with no husband present, and 14.7% were non-families. 13.3% of all households were made up of individuals, and 7.1% had someone living alone who was 65 years of age or older. The average household size was 2.89 and the average family size was 3.18.

In the borough the population was spread out, with 30.1% under the age of 18, 3.3% from 18 to 24, 18.1% from 25 to 44, 33.7% from 45 to 64, and 14.9% who were 65 years of age or older. The median age was 44 years. For every 100 females, there were 98.5 males. For every 100 females age 18 and over, there were 96.2 males.

As of 2015, the median income for a household in the borough was $154,722, and the median income for a family was $169,596. About 3.3% of families and 4.5% of the population were below the poverty line.

=== Religion ===
Four churches are located within the borough: Faith Methodist Church, Christ Church Fox Chapel, Fox Chapel Presbyterian Church, and Good Shepherd Lutheran Church.

In 1953 a group of families living in the Fox Chapel area began to worship together at Shady Side Academy; the congregation became Fox Chapel Presbyterian Church, located at the intersection of Fox Chapel Road and Field Club Road. The Rev. Bickford Lang served as the first pastor. The congregation was officially organized in October 1953 with 339 charter members. The chapel was erected in December 1953, and worship services began to be held on the site of the present church. The church facility has grown to include a Christian Education building, atrium, fellowship hall and a Georgian sanctuary. The Fox Chapel Presbyterian Church has been led by five senior pastors since its founding.

Chabad Fox Chapel - The Jewish Center, opened in 2002 and serves the entire Fox Chapel Area with a Jewish community center, Jewish day camp, Hebrew school and full adult education program with no membership fees.

Adat Shalom, located on Guys Run Road in Indiana Township, serves approximately 240 Jewish families from the Fox Chapel area.

== Government and politics ==
Fox Chapel borough vote by party in presidential elections
| Year | Republican | Democratic | Third parties |
|---|---|---|---|
| 2020 | 37.89% 1,516 | 60.78% 2,432 | 1.32% 53 |
| 2016 | 40.77% 1,386 | 55.35% 1,882 | 3.88% 132 |
| 2012 | 58.96% 1,998 | 40.66% 1,378 | 0.38% 13 |
| 2008 | 53.47% 1,858 | 45.75% 1,590 | 0.78% 27 |

=== Borough Council ===
- Andrew C. Bennett (R) - President
- Harrison Lauer (R) - Vice President
- Betsy Monroe (D)
- Fred Leech (D)
- Bradley Harrison (R)
- Sarah Hanna (D)
- Jonathan Colton (D)
- Walter A. Scott III (R) - Mayor

== Education ==
Public education is provided by the Fox Chapel Area School District. The high school is located in O'Hara Township. The middle school is located in Dorseyville, a small community five miles to the north of the borough in Indiana Township. Elementary school children attend schools located in either Indiana Township or O'Hara Township. These are O'Hara Elementary, Kerr, Fairview, and Hartwood. Fox Chapel Area School District, which includes the communities of Aspinwall, Fox Chapel, Indiana Township, O'Hara Township, Sharpsburg, and Blawnox, has received numerous awards in the past; each of its schools have been named National Blue Ribbon Schools, and the Fox Chapel Area High School has been awarded the Silver Medal rank by the U.S. News & World Report.

Fox Chapel is home to Shady Side Academy, a co-educational independent college preparatory school. Shady Side Academy operates on four separate campuses— a junior school which offers private education for pre-kindergarten, kindergarten, and grades one through five known formerly as Fox Chapel Country Day School, a middle school for grades 6–8, and a senior school for grades 9–12. Shady Side Academy has operated in Fox Chapel since the early 1920s, when it relocated its upper school from nearby urban Shadyside within the Pittsburgh. The middle school campus was a later addition, the result of the academy's 1958 purchase of the former James E. Lewis estate, built in 1928. Both campuses and their playing fields are located in the vicinity of the Fox Chapel Golf Club. Shady Side Academy's fourth campus, the urban junior school, is located in the city in Point Breeze.

Fox Chapel Country Day School which is now part of Shady Side Academy, offers private education for pre-kindergarten, kindergarten, and grades one through five. The Fox Chapel Chabad Community Hebrew School has classes on Sunday and Wednesday and offers a supplemental Jewish education.

The Pittsburgh Japanese School (ピッツバーグ日本語補習授業校 Pittsubāgu Nihongo Hoshū Jugyō Kō), a weekend supplementary Japanese school, uses the middle school facilities of Shady Side Academy. The school, established in 1993, originated from a group of parents starting a Japanese class system in 1977.

== Notable people ==
- Tunde Adebimpe, musician, actor, founding member of TV on the Radio
- Rocky Bleier, former professional football player, Pittsburgh Steelers
- Bill Cowher, former head coach of the Pittsburgh Steelers
- Jim Delligatti, creator of the Big Mac
- Chip Ganassi, former racecar driver and current owner of Chip Ganassi Racing
- Eddie Ifft, stand-up comedian, radio host and sitcom actor
- Edgar J. Kaufmann, department store magnate
- Teresa Heinz Kerry, businesswoman and philanthropist, wife of U.S. Secretary of State John Kerry
- Kathryn Kuhlman, healing evangelist
- Anisha Nagarajan, actress and singer, star of Outsourced
- Barry Nelson, former professional basketball player, Milwaukee Bucks
- David Newell, actor, Mister Rogers' Neighborhood
- Matthew Ridgway, U.S. Army general
- Rick Rockwell, reality TV personality starring in Fox's 2001 "Who Wants to Marry a Multi-Millionaire?"
- Beth Ostrosky Stern, current wife of radio's shock jock Howard Stern
