= Leo Elter =

American football player (1929–2008)

No. 39, 32, 34
- Position: Running back

Personal information
- Born: October 21, 1929; Pittsburgh, Pennsylvania, U.S.
- Died: August 23, 2008 (aged 78); Pittsburgh, Pennsylvania, U.S.
- Listed height: 5 ft 10 in (1.78 m)
- Listed weight: 201 lb (91 kg)

Career information
- High school: Shaler Area (Pittsburgh)
- College: Duquesne (1948-1949); Villanova (1950)
- NFL draft: 1953: undrafted

Career history
- Pittsburgh Steelers (1953–1954); Washington Redskins (1955–1957); Pittsburgh Steelers (1958–1959)

Awards and highlights
- Pro Bowl (1956)

Career NFL statistics
- Rushing yards: 1,380
- Rushing average: 3.7
- Receptions: 46
- Receiving yards: 556
- Total touchdowns: 11
- Stats at Pro Football Reference

Leo William "Ducky" Elter (October 21, 1929 – August 23, 2008) was an American professional football running back in the National Football League (NFL) for the Pittsburgh Steelers and Washington Redskins.

== Early life ==
Elter was born in Pittsburgh, Pennsylvania. He attended Shaler Area High School, where he played football and baseball.

== College career ==
Elter started his college football career at Duquesne University, but then transferred to Villanova University after the Duquesne team disbanded for a short time.

== Military ==
After graduating from college, Elter joined the United States Marine Corps and was recruited to play for the football team at Marine Corps Recruit Depot Parris Island.

== Professional career ==
After being discharged by the Marines, he was signed by Art Rooney, founder of the Pittsburgh Steelers. During his seven-year career in the NFL, he played four seasons with the Steelers (1953–1954 and 1958–1959) and three with the Washington Redskins (1955–1957), rushing for a total of 1,380 yards and catching passes for a total of 556 yards. He was named to the Pro Bowl in 1956.

== After football ==
After retiring from football, Elter worked at the Allegheny County Workhouse in Blawnox, Pennsylvania and coached the inmates' football team. He was elected to the Duquesne University Sports Hall of Fame in 1984 and the Western Pennsylvania Sports Hall of Fame in 1994. In 2000, he was inducted into the American Football Association Hall of Fame.
