= Syria Mosque =

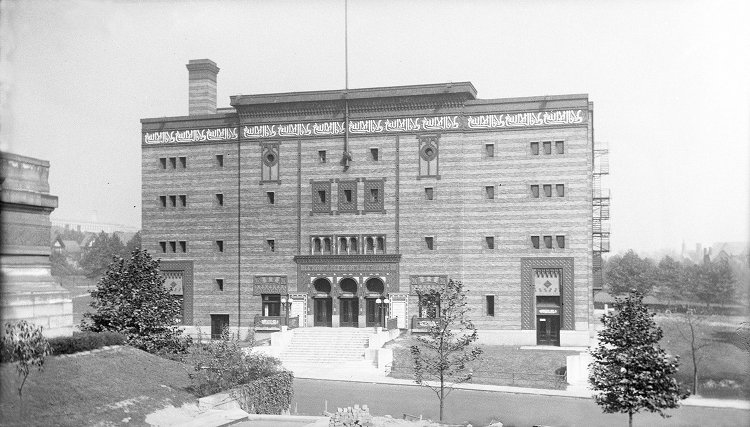
- Photo of Syria Mosque taken c. 1913-1920 by Edward J. Shourek.
- Interactive map of the Syria Mosque area

General information
- Status: Demolished in 1991
- Type: Performance venue
- Architectural style: Exotic Revival architecture
- Location: 4400 Bigelow Boulevard, Pittsburgh, PA, United States of America
- Coordinates: 40.445557°N 79.956347°W
- Completed: 1911
- Inaugurated: 1916

Design and construction
- Architecture firm: Huehl, Schmidt & Holmes
- Known for: Birthplace of network television

Other information
- Seating capacity: 3,700

Syria Mosque was a 3,700-seat performance venue located in the Oakland neighborhood of Pittsburgh, Pennsylvania. Constructed in 1911 and dedicated on October 26, 1916, the building was originally built as a "mystical" shrine for the Ancient Arabic Order of the Nobles of the Mystic Shrine (the Shriners) and designed by Huehl, Schmidt & Holmes architectural firm of Chicago. It was recognized as one of the best examples of Exotic Revival architecture.

Located at 4400 Bigelow Boulevard, it held numerous events over the years, mainly highlighted by concerts of the Pittsburgh Symphony Orchestra and numerous internationally recognized music performers, as well as comedians and political rallies and speeches. In addition to the main theater, events also took place in the building's smaller "Syria Mosque Ballroom" space.

The Medinah Temple in Chicago (constructed one year after this building by the same firm) is a similar building still in existence (though now converted to retail space).

Despite community efforts to have Syria Mosque designated a historic landmark, the building was demolished August 27, 1991.

== History ==
Pakistani-Canadian architect Gulzar Haider described the appearance of the building circa 1960:

As we turned onto a minor street on the University of Pittsburgh campus, [my host] pointed to a vertical neon sign that said in no uncertain terms “Syria Mosque.” Parking the car, we approached the building. I was fascinated, albeit with some premonition. I was riveted by the cursive Arabic calligraphy on the building: la ghalib il-Allah, “There is no victor but Allah,” the well-known refrain [inscribed on the walls of] Granada’s Alhambra. Horseshoe arches, horizontal bands of different colored bricks, decorative terra-cotta—all were devices to invoke a Moorish memory. Excitedly, I took a youthful step towards the lobby, when my host turned around and said, "This is not the kind of mosque in which you bend up and down facing Mecca. This is a meeting hall–theater built by Shriners, a nice bunch of people who build hospitals for [disabled] children and raise money through parades and circuses."

=== Birthplace of network television ===
On January 11, 1949, from 8:30 pm to 11 pm EST, KDKA-TV (then WDTV and part of the DuMont Television Network) began its initial broadcast on its "network" centered in Pittsburgh. The program began with a one-hour local show broadcast from Syria Mosque, then finished with 90 minutes from ABC, CBS, NBC, and DuMont, featuring stars such as Arthur Godfrey, Milton Berle, DuMont host Ted Steele, and many other celebrities. The mosque also hosted closed circuit coverage of sports events including those of Muhammad Ali. The station also represented a milestone in the television industry, providing the first "network" of a coaxial cable feed that included Pittsburgh and 13 other cities from Boston to St. Louis.

=== Demolition ===
Despite community efforts to have the building designated a historic landmark, the Syria Mosque was torn down on August 27, 1991. The site serves as a parking lot for the University of Pittsburgh Medical Center. Plans were announced that University of Pittsburgh would acquire it from the medical center in 2016.

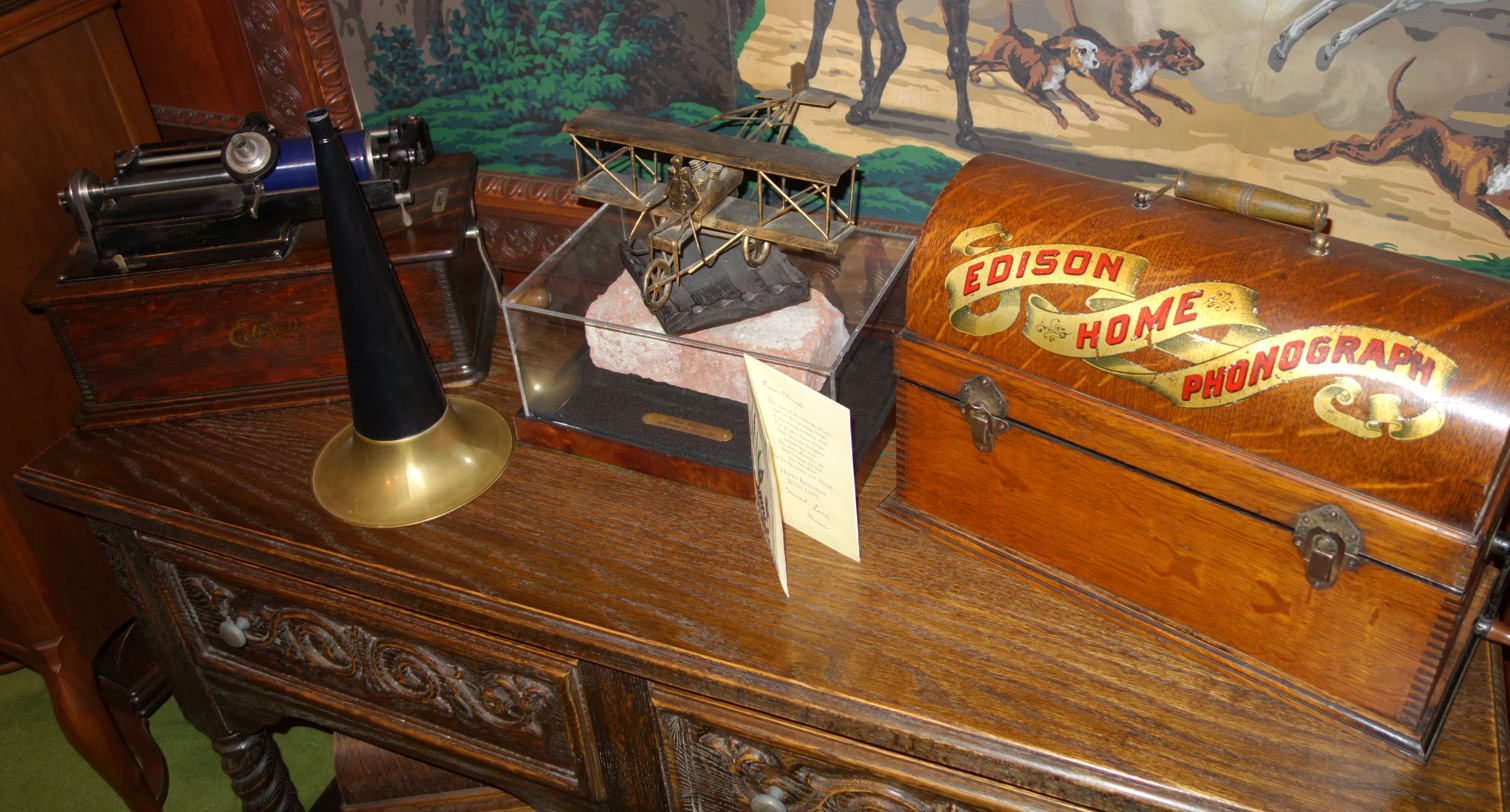
A brick of the Syria Mosque building (center), exhibited in the Bayernhof Museum alongside an Edison cylinder phonograph (left) and Edison home phonograph (right)

== List of concert events ==
Among the concert events:

- February 28, 1920: Enrico Caruso performs 18 months before his death.
- October 5, 1924: John Philip Sousa
- 1931, 1934, 1936, 1937: Sergei Rachmaninoff with the Pittsburgh Symphony Orchestra
- 1938: Benny Goodman
- 1941: Benny Goodman
- 1941: Sergei Rachmaninoff with the Pittsburgh Symphony Orchestra
- January 28, 1944: Leonard Bernstein premiered his Symphony No. 1
- February 1 & 3, 1946: Carol Brice with the Pittsburgh Symphony Orchestra, conducted by Fritz Reiner
- 1949: Louis Armstrong (three appearances)
- October 11, 1950: Billy Eckstine, George Shearing and Miles Davis
- 1950: Charlie Parker
- February 27, 1951: Nat King Cole Trio and Tommy Dorsey and His Orchestra, featuring vocalists Frances Irvin and Johnny Amoroso
- November 24–30, 1952: Pittsburgh International Contemporary Music Festival, featuring performances of 14 commissioned works including Vincent Persichetti's Concerto for Piano, Four Hands. Performing ensembles included the Pittsburgh Symphony Orchestra and the West Point Band.
- January 9, 1953: World premiere of the Heitor Villa-Lobos composition Piano Concerto no. 4, with Bernardo Segall and the Pittsburgh Symphony Orchestra conducted by Villa-Lobos.
- 1954: Duke Ellington
- April 28, 1955: Horace Heidt performed and MC'ed a talent competition for charity.
- 1955: Art Blakey with the Jazz Messengers (several occasions)
- 1955: Miles Davis
- 1955: Bill Haley and the Comets with Bo Diddley and the Drifters
- 1957, 1958 Buddy Holly (four times)
- 1959: Ahmad Jamal
- 1959: Benny Goodman
- 1960: Sam Cooke
- 1963: Dionne Warwick and Solomon Burke
- November 21, 1965 Peter, Paul, and Mary
- 1966: Bob Dylan
- October 26, 1969: The Who
- 1970: The Band
- 1970: The Pittsburgh Ballet Theater opened its first season as a professional organization.
- July 16, 1971: Matthews Southern Comfort, Deep Purple and Faces
- December 16, 1971: Yes
- 1971: Mickey Newbury
- 1971: The Allman Brothers Band This concert was released as the album Syria Mosque in 2022.
- 1971: Pink Floyd
- September 1, 1972: The Kinks
- October 15, 1972: Captain Beefheart and the Magic Band
- 1972: Carly Simon
- 1972: Pink Floyd
- February 23, 1973: Jim Croce. Croce was scheduled to return to the Syria Mosque on October 27, 1973, but he died in a plane crash on September 20.
- August 31, 1973: The Beach Boys
- October 18, 1973: The New York Dolls
- October 26, 1973: Barbara Mandrell
- November 15, 1973: The Doobie Brothers
- 1973: Bette Midler, accompanied by a then-unknown Barry Manilow
- February 14, 1974: Joni Mitchell. Accompanied by Tom Scott and the L.A. Express, who also performed as the opening act.
- April 13, 1974: The Kinks
- May 3, 1974 Genesis
- May 21, 1974: Van Morrison
- November 6, 1974: Frank Zappa
- November 30, 1974: Genesis
- 1974: David Bowie
- 1974: The Carpenters
- 1974: ZZ Top
- 1974: The Eagles
- 1974: Jesse Colin Young
- March 17, 1975: Miles Davis
- May 27, 1975: Lynyrd Skynyrd. Guitarist Ed King's last concert with the original band.
- August 9, 1975: Bruce Springsteen
- October 25, 1975: Stephen Stills
- April 2, 1976: Helen Reddy and Robert Klein
- April 13, 1976: Genesis. A bootleg recording of this show has been widely circulated.
- July 25, 1976: James Taylor
- September 21, 1976: The Band. One of their final performances before their farewell concert The Last Waltz on Thanksgiving night, November 25, 1976.
- October 30, 1976: Kansas. The show was recorded and later broadcast by WDVE-FM.
- 1976: George Benson
- 1976: James Brown
- 1977: Bob Marley
- 1977: George Benson
- 1981: Beatlemania, shortly after the death of John Lennon.
- June 14, 1982: The inaugural Mellon Jazz Festival (among other venues).
- October 1982: Gallagher
- August 4, 1983: Count Basie's final public concert performance.
- August 1983: Men at Work (opening act INXS)
- 1983: Dio
- October 4, 1984: Lou Reed
- November 17, 1984: Frank Zappa
- June 15, 1985: Tears for Fears
- June 30, 1985: Jeffrey Osborne and Whitney Houston
- July 9, 1985: Yngwie Malmsteen's Rising Force
- 1985: Dire Straits
- 1985: R.E.M.
- April 4, 1986: The Cult
- 1986: Black Sabbath
- 1986: Stevie Ray Vaughan and Double Trouble
- 1986: George Benson
- 1986: James Brown
- 1986: The Fabulous Thunderbirds, billed as "The Thunderbirds".
- 1986: R.E.M.
- 1986: The Bangles. Concert broadcast on MTV.
- 1986: New Order
- 1986: Robin Williams
- March 10, 1987: Hüsker Dü
- 1987: The Cure
- 1987: Whitesnake
- 1987: Quiet Riot
- 1987: The Ramones
- February 25, 1988: Frank Zappa
- March 8, 1988: Frank Zappa
- May 4, 1988: Midnight Oil
- September 21, 1988: Ramones (Opening act Jane's Addiction
- October 18, 1988: Fishbone (Opening act Schoolly D))
- 1988: Jimmy Page
- August 31, 1989: Love And Rockets (opening act Pixies)
- December 7, 1989: Jimmy Buffett
- December 27, 1989: Manhattan Transfer
- 1989: Winger
- 1989: Anthrax, Exodus and Helloween (as part of the MTV's Headbangers Ball Tour)
- February 1, 1990: Public Enemy, Queen Latifah and Biz Markie
- February 2, 1990: the B-52's
- March 10, 1990: XYZ
- 1990: Bob Dylan
- January 18, 1991: Vanilla Ice
- February 22, 1991: Benefit for Porky Chedwick
- April 22, 1991: Deep Purple
- May 5, 1991: L.L. Cool J

== List of political events ==
Among the political events:

- October 24, 1923: David Lloyd George.
- January 2, 1944: Harry S Truman
- November 2, 1944: Harry S Truman, Orson Welles, Gifford Pinchot and Kermit Roosevelt
- November 10, 1947: Henry A. Wallace announced he was a candidate for president.
- June 6, 1950: Ronald Reagan
- October 8, 1952: Richard Nixon addressing a crowd of 3,900.
- October 22, 1952: Harry S Truman
- November 1, 1956: Richard Nixon & Pat Nixon
- October 27, 1958: Dwight D. Eisenhower
- October 10, 1960: John F. Kennedy
- October 24, 1960: Richard Nixon
- November 4, 1966: The last public appearance by longtime mayor, governor and boss David L. Lawrence.
