= Rural Ridge, Pennsylvania =

Unincorporated community in Pennsylvania, U.S.

Coordinates: 40°35′08″N 79°49′43″W

Rural Ridge is an unincorporated community in Allegheny County, Pennsylvania, United States. The area known as Rural Ridge is located in the municipality of Indiana Township, in suburban Pittsburgh, and in the Fox Chapel Area School District.

Rural Ridge has two zip codes: 15024 (only in one residential area), and mainly 15075.
