= Indiana, Pennsylvania (disambiguation) =

Indiana, Pennsylvania could refer to:

- The borough of Indiana, Pennsylvania
- Indiana County, Pennsylvania
- Indiana Township, Allegheny County, Pennsylvania
