= Indianola, Pennsylvania =

Unincorporated community in Allegheny County, Pennsylvania

Coordinates: 40.56963°N 79.8622°W

Indianola is an unincorporated community in Allegheny County, Pennsylvania, United States. The area known as Indianola is located in the municipality of Indiana Township, in suburban Pittsburgh, and is served by Fox Chapel Area School District. The ZIP Code is 15051.
