= Adam Bisnowaty =

American football player (born 1993)

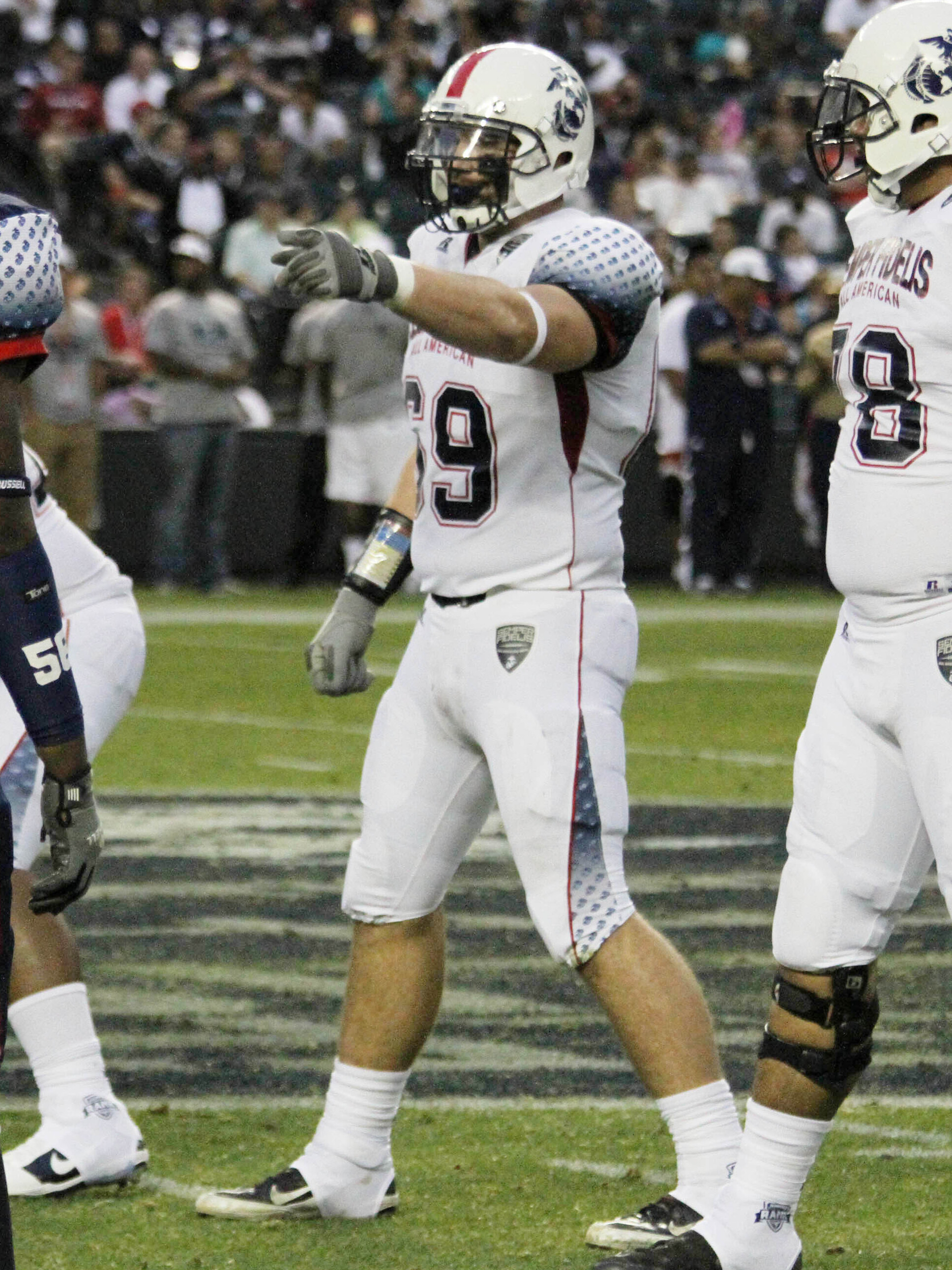
- Bisnowaty during his high school senior year, at the 2012 Semper Fidelis All-American Bowl

No. 66, 78
- Position: Offensive tackle

Personal information
- Born: December 14, 1993 (age 32); Pittsburgh, Pennsylvania, U.S.
- Listed height: 6 ft 6 in (1.98 m)
- Listed weight: 310 lb (141 kg)

Career information
- High school: Fox Chapel Area (Pittsburgh)
- College: Pittsburgh
- NFL draft: 2017: 6th round, 200th overall pick

Career history
- New York Giants (2017); Detroit Lions (2018)*; Carolina Panthers (2018)*; Minnesota Vikings (2018–2019)*; Washington Redskins (2019)*; Denver Broncos (2019)*
- * Offseason or practice squad member only

Awards and highlights
- 2× Second-team All-ACC (2015, 2016)

Career NFL statistics
- Games played: 1
- Games started: 1
- Stats at Pro Football Reference

Adam Bisnowaty (born December 14, 1993) is an American former professional football player who was a tackle in the National Football League (NFL). He played college football for the Pittsburgh Panthers as a four-year starter at left tackle, and was first-team All-Atlantic Coast Conference his last two seasons. He played in the NFL for the New York Giants.

== Early life ==
Bisnowaty was born in Pittsburgh, Pennsylvania, and is Jewish. His parents are Miron and Randi Bisnowaty. He has a sister, Dana Bisnowaty. His father is Israeli-born, grew up in Rishon LeZion, served in the Agaf HaModi'in (the military intelligence unit of the Israel Defense Forces), and came to the United States at the age of 27. Adam's paternal grandmother is a Holocaust survivor who escaped the Nazis by hiding in the woods in Poland.

Bisnowaty said: "I have a deep connection with Israel, my two parents are Jewish, my father is from Israel, and a large part of my family still lives there." He has a large Hebrew tattoo on his left arm, which translates to "I am what I am," which in the Old Testament God said to Moses when Moses asked what to call him.

Growing up, he preferred basketball, baseball, and wrestling to football. In seventh grade, he weighed 210 pounds (95 kg), and in eighth grade he weighed 245 pounds (111 kg), and with his size his attention soon shifted to football.

At Fox Chapel Area High School in Pennsylvania, Bisnowaty played offensive guard and tackle, was ranked the country's # 19 recruit by Rivals, and was a four-star recruit. He was named Pennsylvania Football News All-Class AAAA, and all-conference at defensive tackle. He also competed in wrestling for the high school, and in track and field—throwing discus, javelin, and shot put (for which he holds the school record at 43' 7").

== College career ==
Bisnowaty played college football for the Pittsburgh Panthers, choosing them over Florida and 12 other offers. He earned an undergraduate degree from Pittsburgh in communications in 2015, and a master's degree in health and fitness. All-America

In 2012, he redshirted. Subsequently, Bisnowaty was a four-year starter at left tackle. He was named to the Jewish Sports Review 2014 College Football All-America Offensive Team. He was a First-team All-Atlantic Coast Conference (ACC) selection in each of his final seasons, and was named to the All-ACC Academic team for four consecutive years. As a senior in 2016 he started every game at left tackle. He finished his college career with 43 starts in 45 games.

== Professional career ==
Pre-draft measurables
Height	Weight	Arm length	Hand span	40-yard dash	10-yard split	20-yard split	20-yard shuttle	Three-cone drill	Vertical jump	Broad jump	Bench press
6 ft 5 5/8 in (1.97 m)	304 lb (138 kg)	33 7/8 in (0.86 m)	11 3/8 in (0.29 m)	5.23 s	1.82 s	3.03 s	4.94 s	8.02 s	29.5 in (0.75 m)	8 ft 0 in (2.44 m)	23 reps
All values from NFL Combine

=== New York Giants ===
Bisnowaty was selected by the New York Giants in the sixth round, 200th overall, of the 2017 NFL draft. The Giants traded up seven spots to draft him. He signed with the team in May 2017, on a four-year deal worth $2.5 million with a $147,000 signing bonus. In June 2017, Giants' offensive line coach Mike Solari said: "It's still early. Right now, we got him at right tackle. But he has versatility, he could go to guard." He was waived on September 2, 2017, and was signed to the Giants' practice squad the next day. He was promoted to the active roster on December 30, 2017. The following day, he was the starting right tackle for the Giants in his NFL debut.

On May 14, 2018, Bisnowaty was waived by the Giants.

=== Detroit Lions ===
On May 15, 2018, Bisnowaty was claimed off waivers by the Detroit Lions. He was waived on July 31, 2018.

=== Carolina Panthers ===
On August 1, 2018, Bisnowaty was claimed off waivers by the Carolina Panthers. He was waived on August 31, 2018.

=== Minnesota Vikings ===
On October 23, 2018, Bisnowaty was signed to the Minnesota Vikings practice squad. He reunited with college teammate Brian O'Neill. He signed a reserve/future contract with the Vikings on January 2, 2019. He was waived on May 8, 2019.

=== Washington Redskins ===
On May 23, 2019, Bisnowaty signed with the Washington Redskins, but was waived five days later.

=== Denver Broncos ===
On August 9, 2019, Bisnowaty was signed by the Denver Broncos. He was waived on August 31, 2019.

Bisnowaty was selected in the 7th round in phase two in the 2020 XFL draft by the Dallas Renegades.

== See also ==
- List of select Jewish football players
