= Leo Wisniewski =

American football player (born 1959)

No. 69
- Position: Nose tackle

Personal information
- Born: November 6, 1959 (age 67); Hancock, Michigan, U.S.
- Listed height: 6 ft 1 in (1.85 m)
- Listed weight: 263 lb (119 kg)

Career information
- High school: Fox Chapel Area (Pittsburgh, Pennsylvania)
- College: Penn State (1978–1981)
- NFL draft: 1982: 2nd round, 28th overall pick

Career history
- Baltimore / Indianapolis Colts (1982–1984)

Awards and highlights
- PFWA All-Rookie Team (1982); First-team All-East (1981)

Career NFL statistics
- Sacks: 14.5
- Fumble recoveries: 3
- Stats at Pro Football Reference

Leo Joseph Wisniewski (born November 6, 1959) is an American former professional football player who was a nose tackle for the Baltimore / Indianapolis Colts of the National Football League (NFL) from 1982 to 1984. He played college football for the Penn State Nittany Lions and was selected by the Colts in the second round of the 1982 NFL draft.

== Early life ==
After going to high school at Fox Chapel Area High School in Pittsburgh, Pennsylvania, Wisniewski attended Pennsylvania State University where he played nose tackle. Over his four years at Penn State he recorded 102 tackles and 11 QB sacks.

== Professional career ==
Wisniewski was selected in the second round (28th overall pick) in the 1982 NFL draft by the Baltimore Colts. In 1982, Wisniewski spent the first two games of the strike shortened season on injured reserve, but started at nose tackle the final seven. He was credited with 52 total tackles (32 solo) and 2.5 QB sacks. In 1983, Wisniewski played in 15 games (started 14) and made 95 total tackles (50 solo) and 5.0 QB sacks. He missed the game against the Chicago Bears (September 25, 1983) with a strained knee. In 1984, his final year, Wisniewski started in 14 of the 16 games, but missed the final two games on the injured reserve with a knee injury. He made 88 total tackles (51 solo) and 7.0 QB sacks.

== Personal life ==
Leo's brother Steve Wisniewski was a two-time All-American at Penn State as an offensive lineman, and an 8-time Pro Bowler with the Oakland Raiders. Leo's son Stefen is a former guard and center in the NFL.
