= Jim Delligatti =

American businessman (1918–2016)

- Born: Michael James Delligatti; August 2, 1918; Uniontown, Pennsylvania, U.S.
- Died: November 28, 2016 (aged 98); Fox Chapel, Pennsylvania, U.S.
- Education: Fairmont Senior High School
- Occupation: Businessman
- Known for: Creating the Big Mac
- Spouses: Ann Vunora; Eleanor Carmody (m. 1962)
- Children: 2

Michael James Delligatti (August 2, 1918 – November 28, 2016) was an American entrepreneur. He was an early franchisee of the fast food restaurant chain McDonald's, opening the first of his eventual 48 branches in Uniontown, Pennsylvania, in 1957. Delligatti is famously known as the creator of McDonald's "Big Mac" hamburger in 1967.

== Early life ==
Michael James Delligatti was born in Uniontown, Pennsylvania, on August 2, 1918, the son of James Delligatti, a farrier, cobbler and candy maker, and his wife, Lucille Dandrea. He was of Italian descent. Delligatti attended grammar school in Uniontown before his family moved to Fairmont, West Virginia. After graduating Fairmont Senior High School, he served with the United States Army in Europe during World War II between 1942 and 1943. He was discharged after suffering from trench foot.

== Career ==
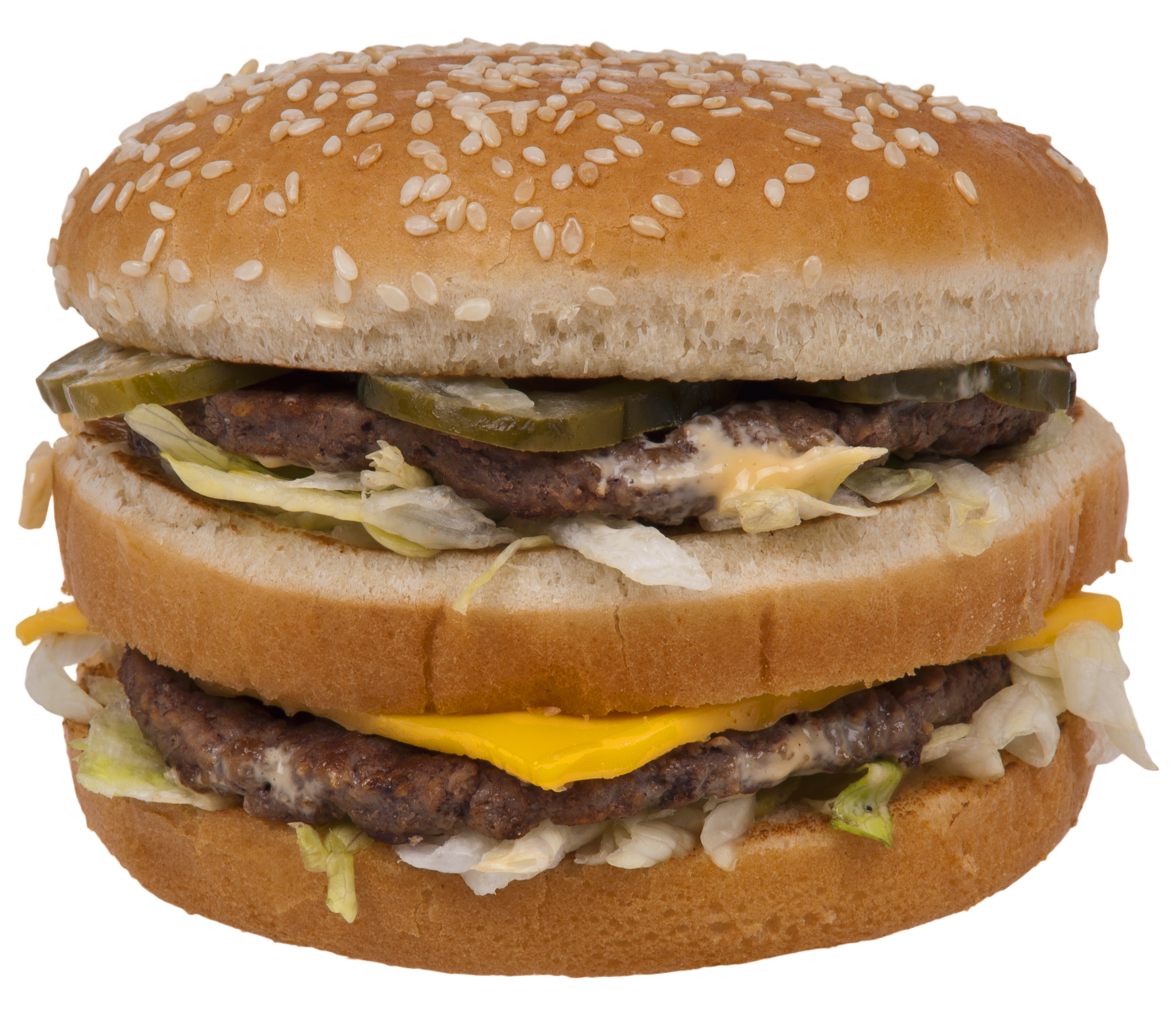
Big Mac hamburger

After the war, Delligatti owned a drive-through restaurant in Newport Beach, California. After meeting Ray Kroc at a restaurant fair in 1955, Delligatti started as a McDonald's franchisee in 1957. His franchise was based in Uniontown, Pennsylvania, about 40 miles (64 km) south of Pittsburgh, and his holdings grew to 48 stores.

Delligatti conceived the Big Mac in 1965 in the kitchen of his first McDonald's franchise, on McKnight Road in suburban Ross Township. He started serving it at his Uniontown McDonald's in April 1967 for 45 cents (equivalent to $4 in 2025). By 1968, the Big Mac was on the menu of every American McDonald's, and in 1969, it accounted for 19% of total sales. According to a 1970s jingle the burger contains: "two all-beef patties, special sauce, lettuce, cheese, pickles, onions on a sesame-seed bun."

Interviewed by the Los Angeles Times in 1993, Delligatti agreed that he was not the inventor of the double-decker burger: "This wasn't like discovering the lightbulb. The bulb was already there. All I did was screw it in the socket." In an interview with a Pittsburgh television station, Delligatti said that he had received no royalty payments for the creation of the Big Mac, but had received a plaque. According to his son Michael, Jim ate a Big Mac every week.

In 2007, Delligatti opened the Big Mac Museum, home to the "world's largest Big Mac", which is more than 13 feet (4 meters) across. As of 2016, McDonald's sells about 550 million Big Macs in the U.S. every year.

== Personal life and death ==
Delligatti was married twice, with his first marriage to Ann Vunora ending in divorce. They had one son. He and his second wife, Eleanor "Ellie" Carmody, had one son, five grandchildren, and eight great-grandchildren. He died on November 28, 2016, at his home in Fox Chapel, Pennsylvania, at age 98.
