= Indiana Township, Allegheny County, Pennsylvania =

Township in Pennsylvania, US

Indiana Township
- Township and census-designated place
- Township of Indiana
- Logo
- Nicknames: Fox Chapel, Indiana, Indianola, I-Town
- Interactive map of Indiana Township
- Location within Pennsylvania Location within the United States
- Coordinates: 40°33′55″N 79°53′8″W
- Country: United States
- State: Pennsylvania
- County: Allegheny

Government
  - Mayor: Albert Kaan (R)

Population (2022)
  - Total: 7,341
- Time zone: UTC-5 (Eastern (EST))
  - Summer (DST): UTC-4 (EDT)
- ZIP codes: 15024, 15051, 15075, 15101, 15116, 15238
- Area code: 412
- Website: indianatownship.com

Indiana Township is a township in Allegheny County, Pennsylvania, and a Pittsburgh suburb located in the United States. It contains the communities of Rural Ridge, Dorseyville, and Indianola. The population was 7,255 at the 2020 census.

The township was named after the Indiana Territory.

== Geography ==
According to the United States Census Bureau, the township has a total area of 17.7 square miles (46 km^{2}), all land. it contains part of the census-designated place of Allison Park.

=== Streams ===
Deer Creek flows through the township.

The township contains the following communities: Dorseyville, Indianola, Rural Ridge, and Fox Chapel.

=== Surrounding neighborhoods ===
Indiana Township has seven borders, including West Deer Township to the north, Frazer Township to the east, Harmar Township and Fox Chapel to the south, O'Hara Township to the southwest and the Shaler and Hampton townships to the west.

== Demographics ==
Historical population
Census	Pop.	Note	%±
1970	5,621		—
1980	6,080		8.2%
1990	6,024		−0.9%
2000	6,809		13.0%
2010	7,253		6.5%
2020	7,255		0.0%
2022 (est.)	7,341		1.2%
U.S. Decennial Census

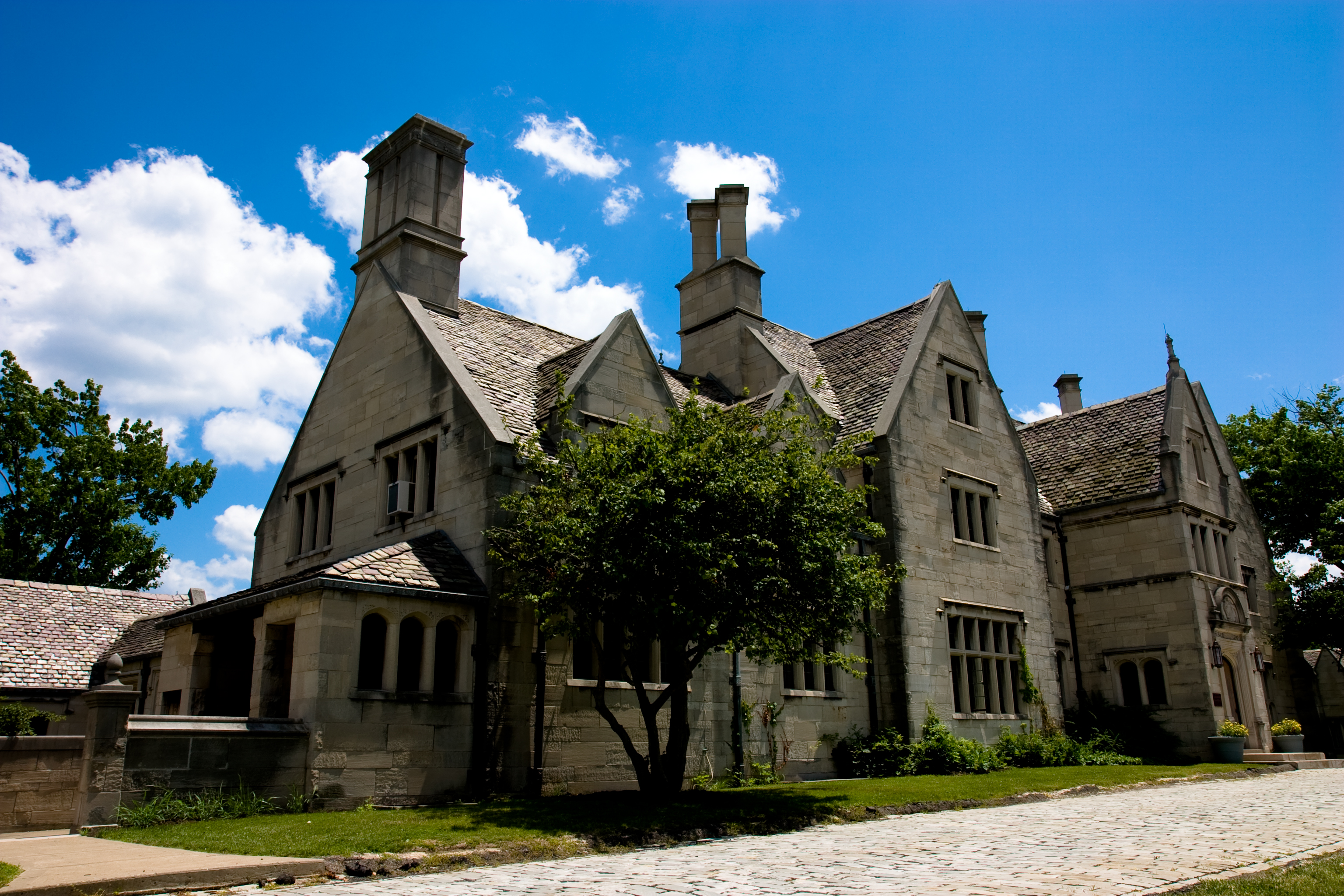
Mansion at Hartwood Acres Park

As of the 2000 census, there were 6,809 people, 2,347 households, and 1,828 families residing in the township. The population density was 384.2 people per square mile (148.3 people/km^{2}). There were 2,457 housing units at an average density of 138.6 per square mile (53.5/km^{2}). The racial makeup of the township was 95.67% White, 1.29% African American, 0.06% Native American, 2.16% Asian, 0.03% Pacific Islander, 0.31% from other races, and 0.48% from two or more races. Hispanic or Latino of any race were 0.54% of the population.

There were 2,347 households, out of which 38.0% had children under the age of 18 living with them, 66.0% were married couples living together, 8.5% had a female householder with no husband present, and 22.1% were non-families. 18.7% of all households were made up of individuals, and 8.7% had someone living alone who was 65 years of age or older. The average household size was 2.74 and the average family size was 3.14.

In the township the population was spread out, with 27.2% under the age of 18, 5.0% from 18 to 24, 26.5% from 25 to 44, 25.3% from 45 to 64, and 16.1% who were 65 years of age or older. The median age was 41 years. For every 100 females there were 96.7 males. For every 100 females age 18 and over, there were 92.8 males.

The median income for a household in the township was $55,168, and the median income for a family was $65,110. Males had a median income of $50,481 versus $33,914 for females. The per capita income for the township was $27,068. About 4.2% of families and 6.4% of the population were below the poverty line, including 8.0% of those under age 18 and 3.3% of those age 65 or over.

== Government and politics ==
Presidential election results
Year	Republican	Democratic	Third parties
2020	50% 2,221	48% 2,153	1% 62
2016	52% 1,934	44% 1,627	4% 129
2012	58% 2,111	41% 1,494	1% 40

=== Township Board of Supervisors ===
- [2017-2019] Republicans-5 (Schurko, Krally, Taylor, Kaan, Jorgensen), Democrats-0

== Communities ==
- Dorseyville
- Indianola
- Rural Ridge

== Education ==
The township is within the Fox Chapel Area School District.

== Notable person ==
- Shooby Taylor (1929–2003); scat singer, born in Indiana Township
