= Symphony No. 1 (Bernstein) =

1942 composition by Leonard Bernstein

- Jeremiah
- by Leonard Bernstein
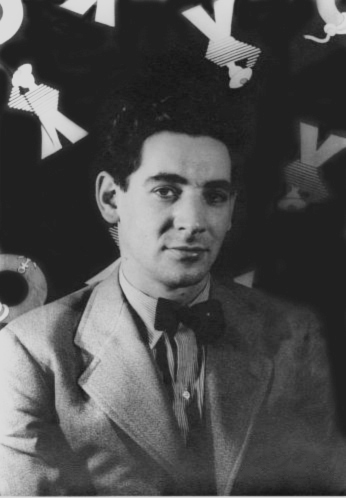
- The composer in 1944
- Text: from Book of Lamentations
- Language: Hebrew
- Composed: 1942
- Performed: January 28, 1944
- Duration: c. 24 minutes
- Movements: three
- Scoring: mezzo-soprano; orchestra

Leonard Bernstein's Symphony No. 1 Jeremiah was composed in 1942. Jeremiah is a programmatic work, following the Biblical story of the prophet Jeremiah. The third movement uses texts from the Book of Lamentations in the Hebrew Bible, sung by a mezzo-soprano. The work won the New York Music Critics' Circle Award for the best American work of 1944.

Even though the Book of Jeremiah is written in Aramaic, Bernstein used the Hebrew version.

== Instrumentation ==
The symphony is written for 2 flutes, piccolo, 2 oboes, English horn, E♭ clarinet doubling bass clarinet, 2 clarinets, 2 bassoons, contrabassoon, 4 horns, 3 trumpets, 3 trombones, tuba, percussion (timpani, snare drum, bass drum, cymbals, triangle, wood block, and maracas), piano, mezzo-soprano, and strings.

A performance lasts about 24 minutes.

== Movements ==
The symphony is in three movements:

1. "Prophecy"
2. "Profanation"
3. "Lamentation"

== Premiere ==
The work was premiered on January 28, 1944, at the Syria Mosque in Pittsburgh with the composer conducting the Pittsburgh Symphony Orchestra. The soloist was Jennie Tourel. It was premiered in New York City at Carnegie Hall on March 29, 1944, again with Tourel as soloist.

== Recordings ==
Bernstein first recorded the symphony in February 1945 with the St. Louis Symphony Orchestra and soloist Nan Merriman for RCA Victor. He re-recorded it in stereo for CBS Records in 1962 with Tourel and the New York Philharmonic. A live concert with the Israel Philharmonic Orchestra and soloist Christa Ludwig at the 1977 Berlin Festival was recorded and released as DVD. It was also released as LP/CD by Deutsche Grammophon.

It went unrecorded by anyone else until after the composer's death. It has since been taken up by several conductors, and recordings now include those by Leonard Slatkin (twice), James Judd, Marin Alsop, Gustavo Dudamel and Antonio Pappano. The "Lamentation" movement has also been recorded as a standalone work. A transcription of the "Profanation" movement exists for wind band, completed by Frank Bencriscutto. As a doctoral student, Mike Lebrias transcribed the entire symphony for wind ensemble, premiering in October of 2023.
