= Fox Chapel Area High School =

Coordinates: 40.518921°N 79.869039°W

- The school photographed in 2024
- 611 Field Club Road; Pittsburgh, Pennsylvania 15238; United States

Information
- Type: Public
- Motto: The Fox Chapel Area School District exists to maximize student learning, achievement, and growth through a focus on educating the whole student.
- Established: 1961
- School district: Fox Chapel Area School District
- Principal: Michael Hower, Ed.D., Lead Principal Michelle Young, Ph.D., Program Principal (A-L) Nicole Smith, Ed.D., Program Principal (M-Z)
- Staff: 94.79 (FTE)
- Grades: 9-12
- Student to teacher ratio: 13.50
- Colors: Red, white, and black
- Athletics: Baseball (Boys – Spring); Basketball (Boys, Girls – Winter); Cheerleading (Girls – Fall, Winter); Cross Country (Boys, Girls – Fall); Field Hockey (Girls – Fall); Football (Boys – Fall); Golf (Boys, Girls – Fall); Gymnastics (Girls – Winter); Indoor Track (Boys, Girls – Winter); Lacrosse (Boys, Girls – Spring); Soccer (Boys, Girls – Fall); Softball (Girls – Spring); Swimming/Diving (Boys, Girls – Winter); Tennis (Girls – Fall, Boys – Spring); Track & Field (Boys, Girls – Spring); Volleyball (Girls – Fall, Boys – Winter); and Wrestling (Boys, Girls – Winter)
- Athletics conference: WPIAL 3A, 4A & 5A (PIAA District 7)
- Mascot: The Fox
- Website: https://fcahs.fcasd.edu/

Fox Chapel Area High School (established in 1961) is a public school located in the Pittsburgh suburb of O'Hara Township, Allegheny County, Pennsylvania, United States. It was recognized and honored as a National Blue Ribbon School twice.

The Fox Chapel Area High School serves the municipalities of Fox Chapel, Aspinwall, Blawnox, Indiana, O'Hara and Sharpsburg and is apart of the Fox Chapel Area School District.

== School performance ==
Fox Chapel Area High School has been awarded Silver Medal rankings by U.S. News & World Report over the past decade and is consistently ranked among the nation's top high schools by Newsweek. It was recently ranked the 9th best public high school in Pennsylvania, and the 3rd best public high school in Pittsburgh both by Niche. The high school is ranked among the top 500 high schools in the US and consistently receives an “A+ Overall Niche Grade” on niche.com.

== High school renovations ==
High school renovations were completed in 2016 and the building has a large swimming pool/natatorium and an upgraded library/media center, auditorium, cafeteria, and commons area. The high school includes state-of-the-art computer, science, digital art, technology, and music labs.

== Current student demographics ==
As of October 2023.

| Subset | Number of students | Percent |
|---|---|---|
| All | 1,280 | 100% |
| White | 1,013 | 79.14% |
| Black or African American | 48 | 3.75% |
| Asian | 106 | 8.28% |
| Hispanic | 56 | 4.38% |
| American Indian/Alaskan Native | 1 | 0.08% |
| Multi-Racial | 56 | 4.38% |
| Male | 697 | 54.45% |
| Female | 583 | 45.55% |

== Athletic interscholastic sports teams ==
Baseball (Boys – Spring)

Basketball (Boys, Girls – Winter)

Cheerleading (Girls – Fall, Winter)

Cross Country (Boys, Girls – Fall)

Field Hockey (Girls – Fall)

Football (Boys – Fall)

Golf (Boys, Girls – Fall)

Gymnastics (Girls – Winter)

Indoor Track (Boys, Girls – Winter)

Lacrosse (Boys, Girls – Spring)

Soccer (Boys, Girls – Fall)

Softball (Girls – Spring)

Swimming/Diving (Boys, Girls – Winter)

Tennis (Girls – Fall, Boys – Spring)

Track & Field (Boys, Girls – Spring)

Volleyball (Girls – Fall, Boys – Winter)

Wrestling (Boys, Girls – Winter)

Club Sports

Crew, Fencing, and Ice Hockey

== Notable alumni ==
- Reb Beach - guitarist
- Adam Bisnowaty - NFL football player
- Chip Ganassi - racing driver and team owner
- Gaelen Gilliland - musical theater actress
- Jeff Habay - Pennsylvania State Representative
- Eddie Ifft - stand-up comedian
- Michael Mitnick - screenplay writer for The Giver
- Patrick Monteverde (2016) - baseball player
- Anisha Nagarajan (2002) - actress and singer
- Beth Stern - television personality and actress
- Rick Strom - professional football player and football commentator
- William Thomas - professional ice hockey player
- Leo Wisniewski - professional football player
- Harran Zureikat - college football player
