= East-West Stadium =

Football stadium in Fairmont, West Virginia

Coordinates: 39°28′6″N 80°9′10″W

East–West Stadium is a football stadium in Fairmont, West Virginia, United States, that is operated and owned by the Marion County Board of Education. The stadium was built in 1938 using Works Progress Administration funding. It is the home outdoor athletic facility for the city's two high schools, Fairmont Senior High School and East Fairmont High School, hosting each school's football, soccer, lacrosse, and track teams.

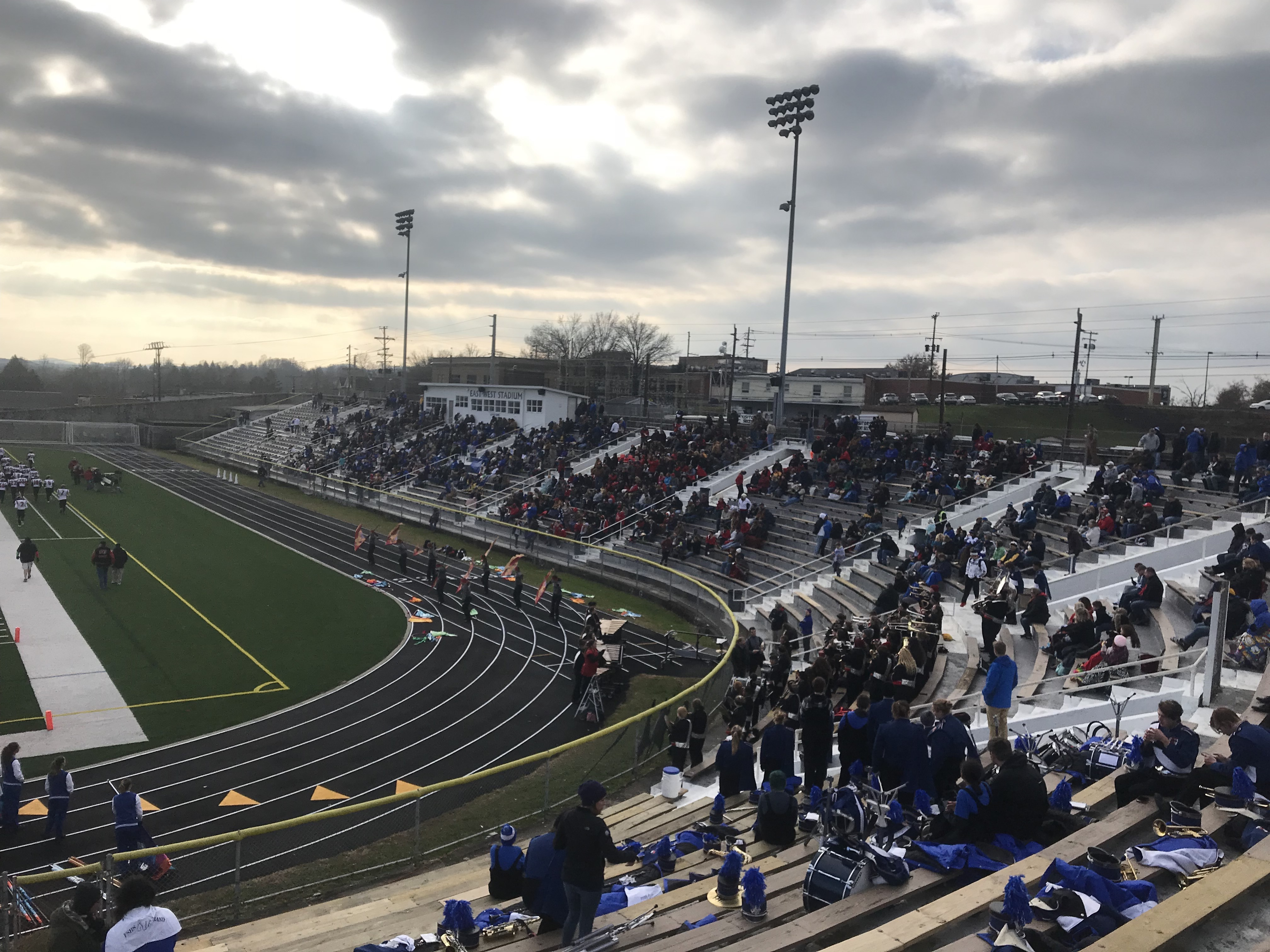
East-West Stadium during a football game, November 2018
