= Fairmont Senior High School =

High school in West Virginia, US

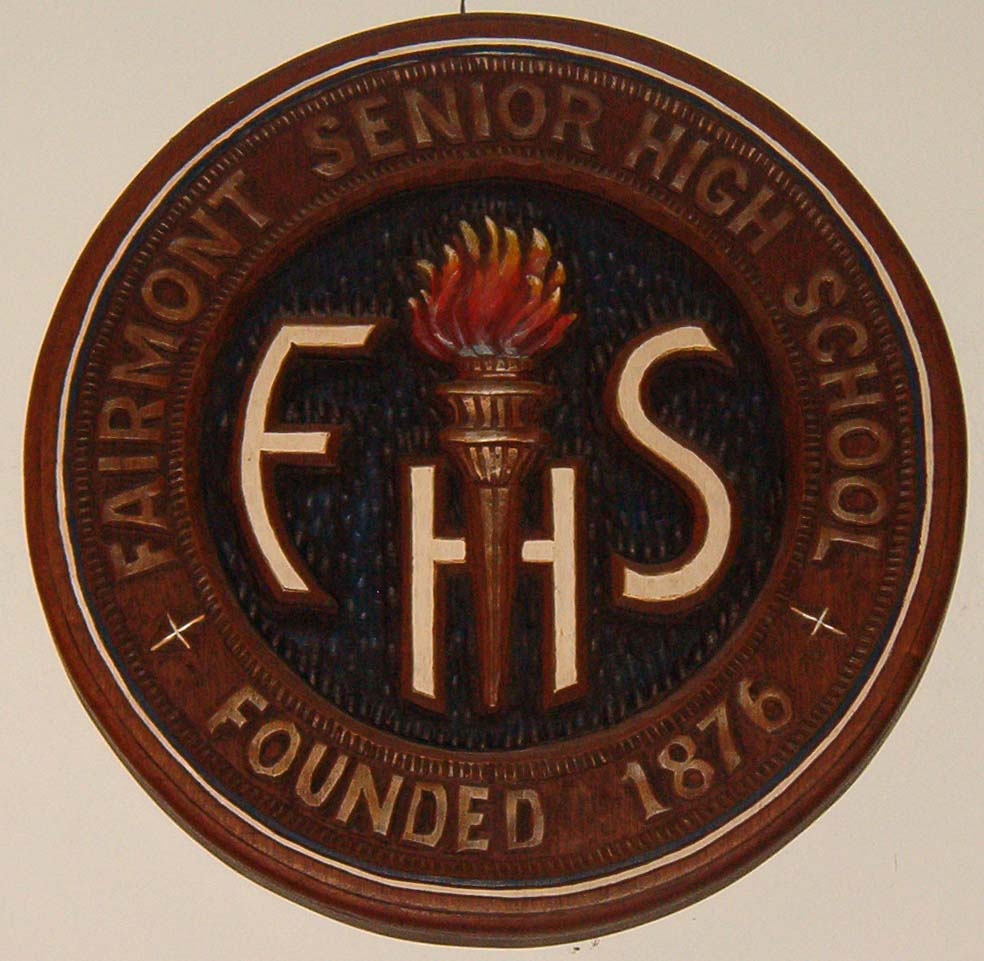

Location
- 1 Loop Park Drive; Fairmont, West Virginia 26554; United States; 39°28′42″N 80°9′27″W

Information
- School type: Public secondary
- School board: Marion County
- Superintendent: Donna Heston
- Principal: Jim Green
- Teaching staff: 42.00 (FTE)
- Grades: 9–12
- Enrollment: 835 (2024–2025)
- Student to teacher ratio: 19.88
- Campus size: 15.0 acres (61,000 m^{2})
- Colors: Royal blue and white
- Athletics conference: Big Ten
- Nickname: Polar Bears
- Rivals: East Fairmont High School, North Marion High School, Bridgeport High School
- Yearbook: Maple Leaves
- Website: https://www.marionboe.com/o/fairmont-sr-hs
- Fairmont Senior High School
- U.S. National Register of Historic Places
- Location within West Virginia Location within the United States
- Coordinates: 39°28′42″N 80°9′27″W
- Built: 1928
- Architect: William B. Ittner
- Architectural style: Colonial Revival
- NRHP reference No.: 02000254
- Added to NRHP: March 22, 2002

Fairmont Senior High School, is a public high school in Fairmont, West Virginia. The current school building, built in 1928, is listed on the National Register of Historic Places. Serving grades nine through twelve, it is one of three high schools in Marion County, along with East Fairmont High School and North Marion High School.

Fairmont High School was established at the Second Ward Building in the late 1800s. The school relocated to 5th Street in 1905 and to Loop Park in 1929. The high school was an all-white school until the 1950s. The school offers a number of different extracurricular activities, such as marching band, a choir program, a theater program, and athletic opportunities. Notable alumni include Olympic gold medalist Mary Lou Retton, U.S. Air Force officer Frank Kendall Everest Jr., entrepreneur Jim Delligatti, and business executive Heather Bresch.

== History ==
Second Ward Building

Marion County did not have a public education system until the creation of the State of West Virginia in 1863 during the American Civil War. Due to a growing student population in Marion County, there was a need for more schools. Fairmont High School would become the first of these high schools to be established in Marion County.

In 1876 or 1897, Fairmont High School was established in the Second Ward Building.

=== 5th Street building ===
5th Street building

In 1905, Fairmont High School relocated to its second location at the 5th Street building, which is now a gym.

=== Loop Park building ===
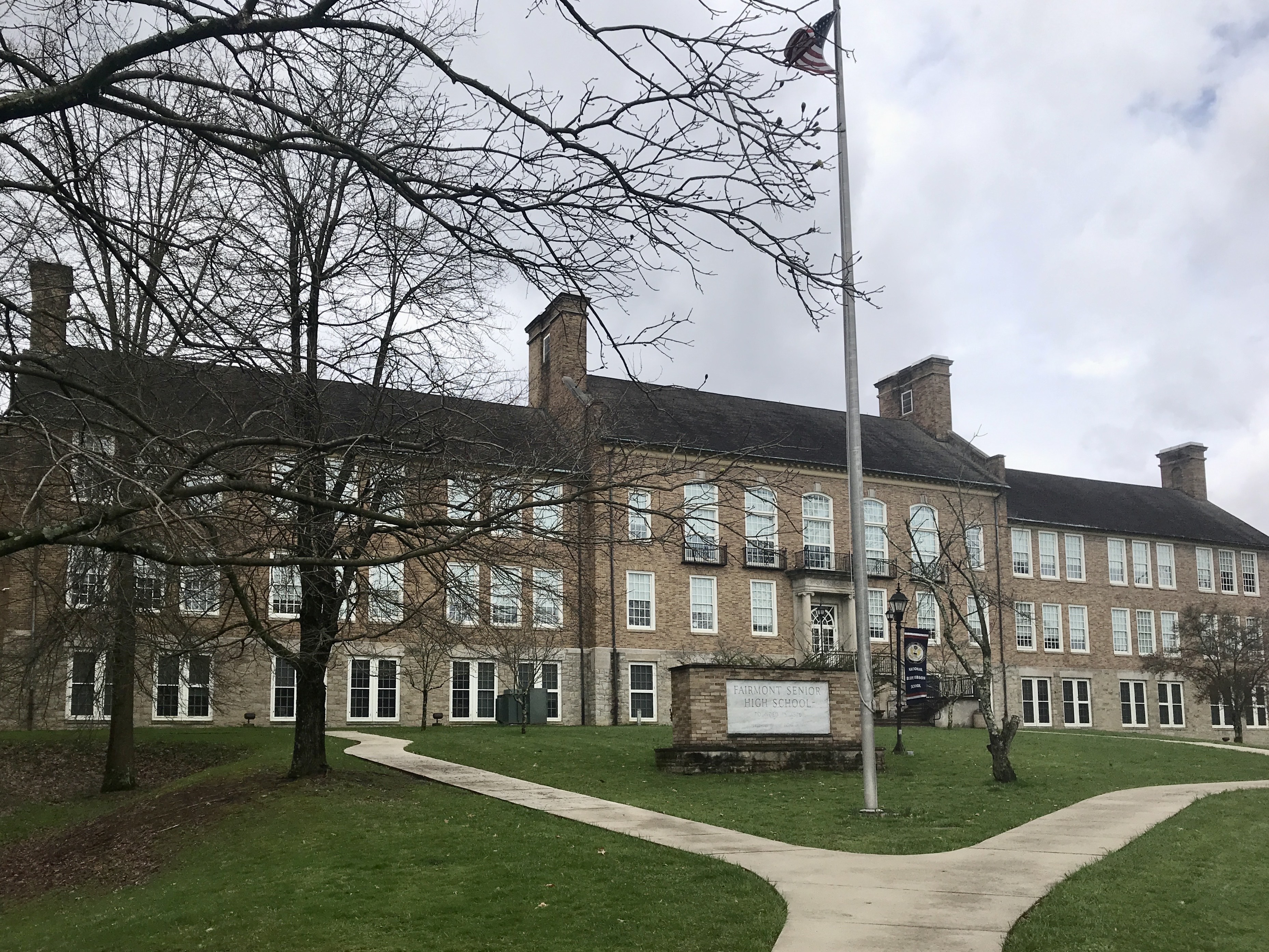
Loop Park building

In 1929, the high school opened at the current Loop Park location. The school was built in 1928 by architect William B. Ittner.

Until the 1950s, Fairmont Senior High School was an all-white school. In 1954, the Supreme Court of the United States ruled that segregated schools had to integrate in the Brown v. the Board of Education decision. As a result, the all-Black Dunbar School was closed and integrated with Fairmont Senior. On September 30, 1954, Fairmont Senior played a football game with Dunbar School, the only football game the two schools played together before Dunbar School closed.

In 1979, a fire damaged a large section of the school's roof. Much of the Loop Park building was constructed with concrete, which helped to mitigate the fire's damage.

On March 22, 2002, the United States government listed Fairmont Senior on the National Register of Historic Places.

== Campus ==
The campus currently consists of several different components, such as a main building, the Freshman Building, and physical education facilities. The Loop Park building's architectural classification is Colonial Revival.

=== Senior Court ===
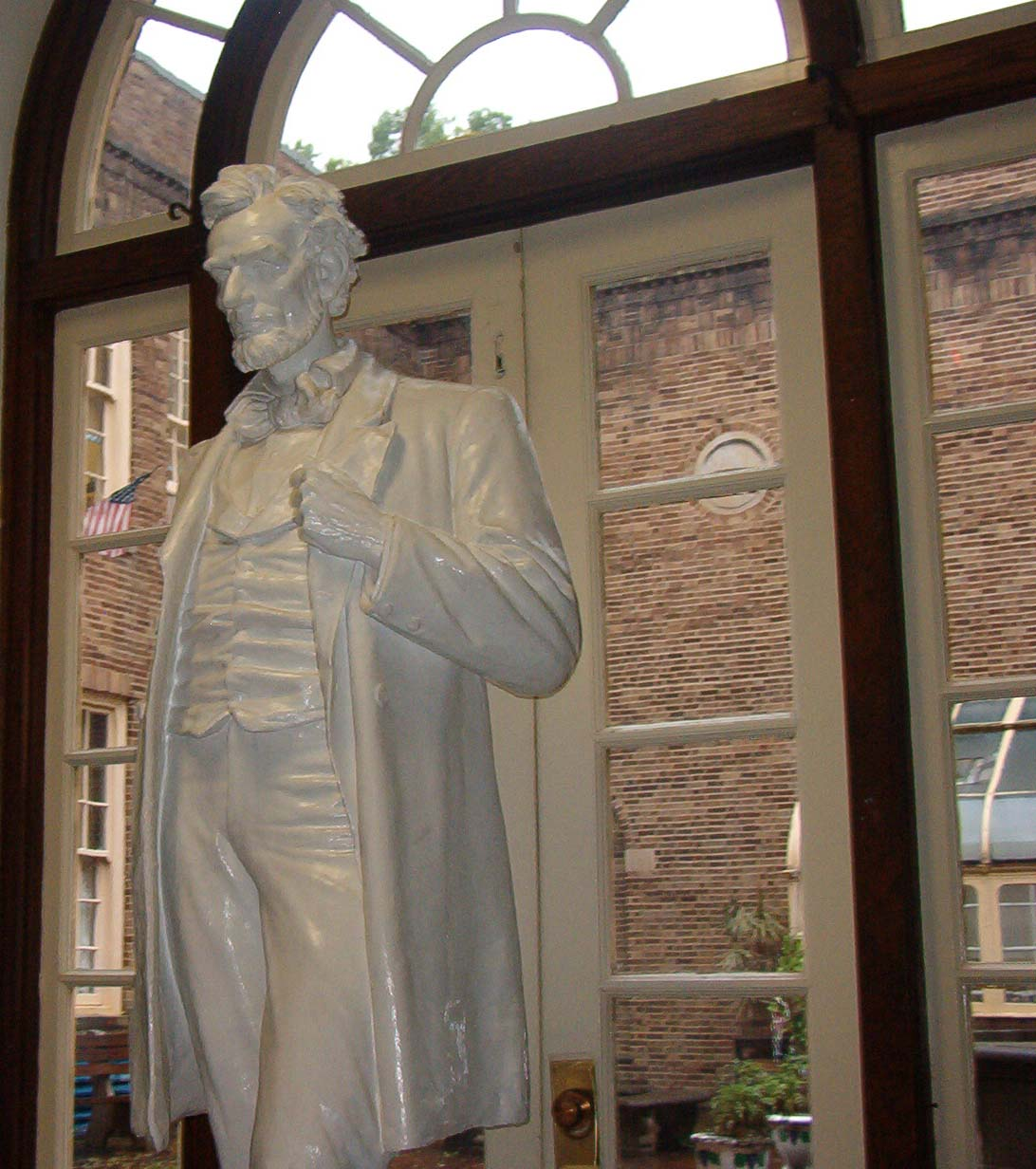
A statue of Abraham Lincoln in front of the now-defunct Senior Court before 2009. The Senior Court was later replaced by a media center.

Senior Court was a feature of the Loop Park building. The Senior Court did not have a ceiling, and there is a statue of U.S. President Abraham Lincoln standing in front of it.

In 2010, a school bond was passed by the Marion County Board of Education to renovate Fairmont Senior's campus. This $4.2 million project included replacing the Senior Court with a school media center. The project took a few years to complete. Unlike the Senior Court, the media center has a ceiling and is a two-story room with a balcony.

=== Physical education facilities ===
Originally, Fairmont Senior only had one gymnasium, which was located on the second floor of the main building. In November 1989, a proposal was made for a new physical education facility beside Fairmont Senior's Freshman Building. Work for the facility began in 1992. Despite objections and a lawsuit from area residents, the facility was completed a few years later.

=== Freshman Building ===
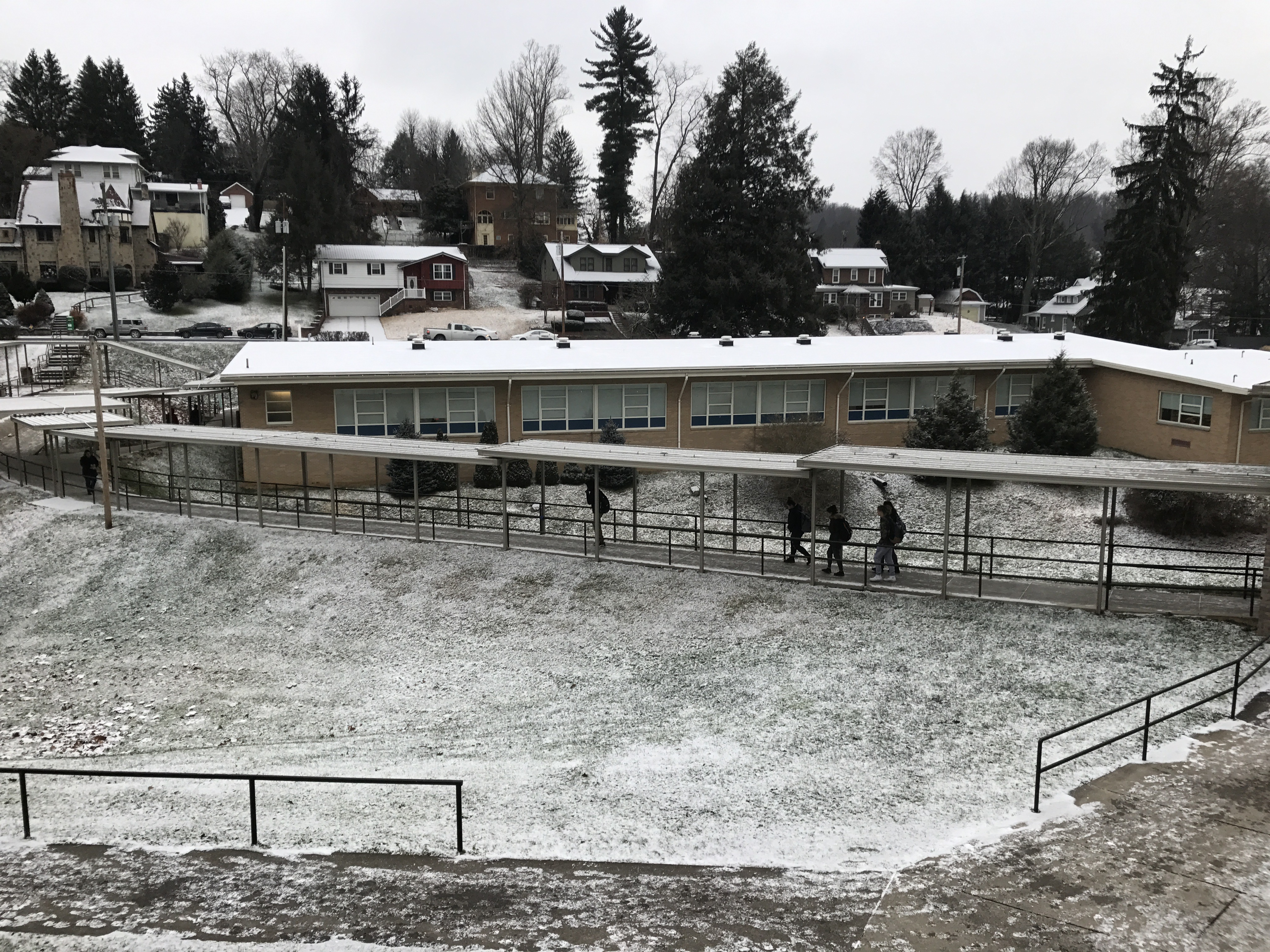
The Freshman Building in the winter of 2017.

Fairmont Senior has a one-story building located at the east end of its campus, which is known as the Freshman Building. In the early 1990s, a chemistry lab was built adjacent to the Freshman Building.

== Academics ==
Fairmont Senior High School offers different academic opportunities for its students. The schools offers math, English, science, social studies, foreign language, special education, and elective classes.

The school offers a number of different Advanced Placement classes. The AP classes offered in Fairmont Senior's 2020–21 school year include AP Art History, AP Calculus AB, AP Chemistry, AP Comparative Government and Politics, AP English Language and Composition, AP English Literature and Composition, AP European History, AP Music Theory, AP Psychology, AP Statistics, AP U.S. Government and Politics, and AP United States History.

== Fine arts ==
Fairmont Senior High School offers different fine arts programs for its students.

=== Marching band ===
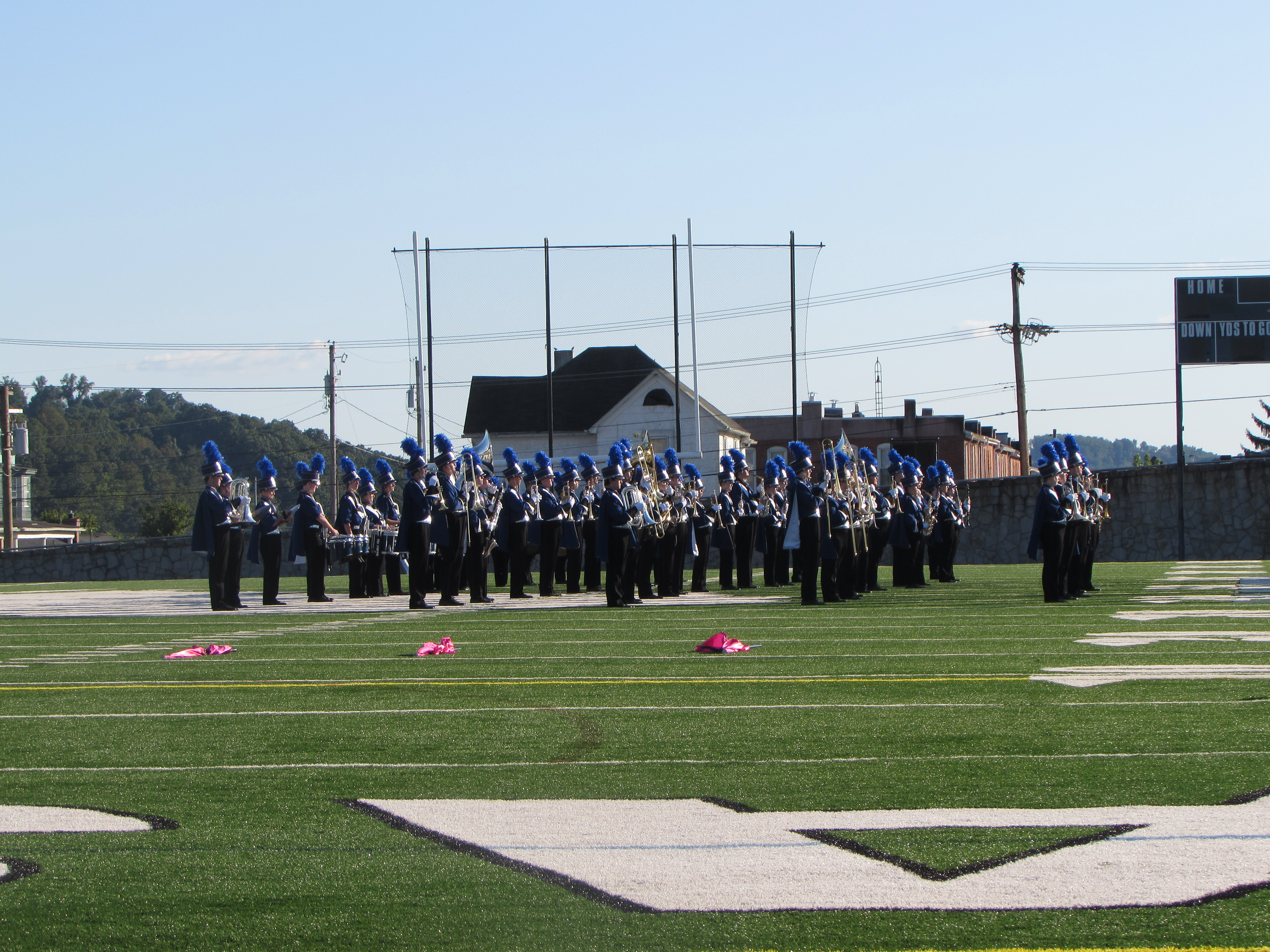
Fairmont Senior's marching band plays at East-West Stadium for the 52nd annual FSHS Band Spectacular in 2017.

Fairmont Senior has a marching band, which is known as the Fairmont Senior High School Polar Bear Band. The school's marching band was first directed full time by Earl McConnell Sr. The marching band has performed in the Macy's Thanksgiving Day Parade in New York City, Walt Disney World, and Universal Studios. The school holds a Band Spectacular annually at East-West Stadium where college and high school bands play their respective field shows.

Other than the school's marching band, the school's instrumental music curriculum has previously included symphonic band, concert band, jazz ensemble, and steel band.

=== Choir program ===
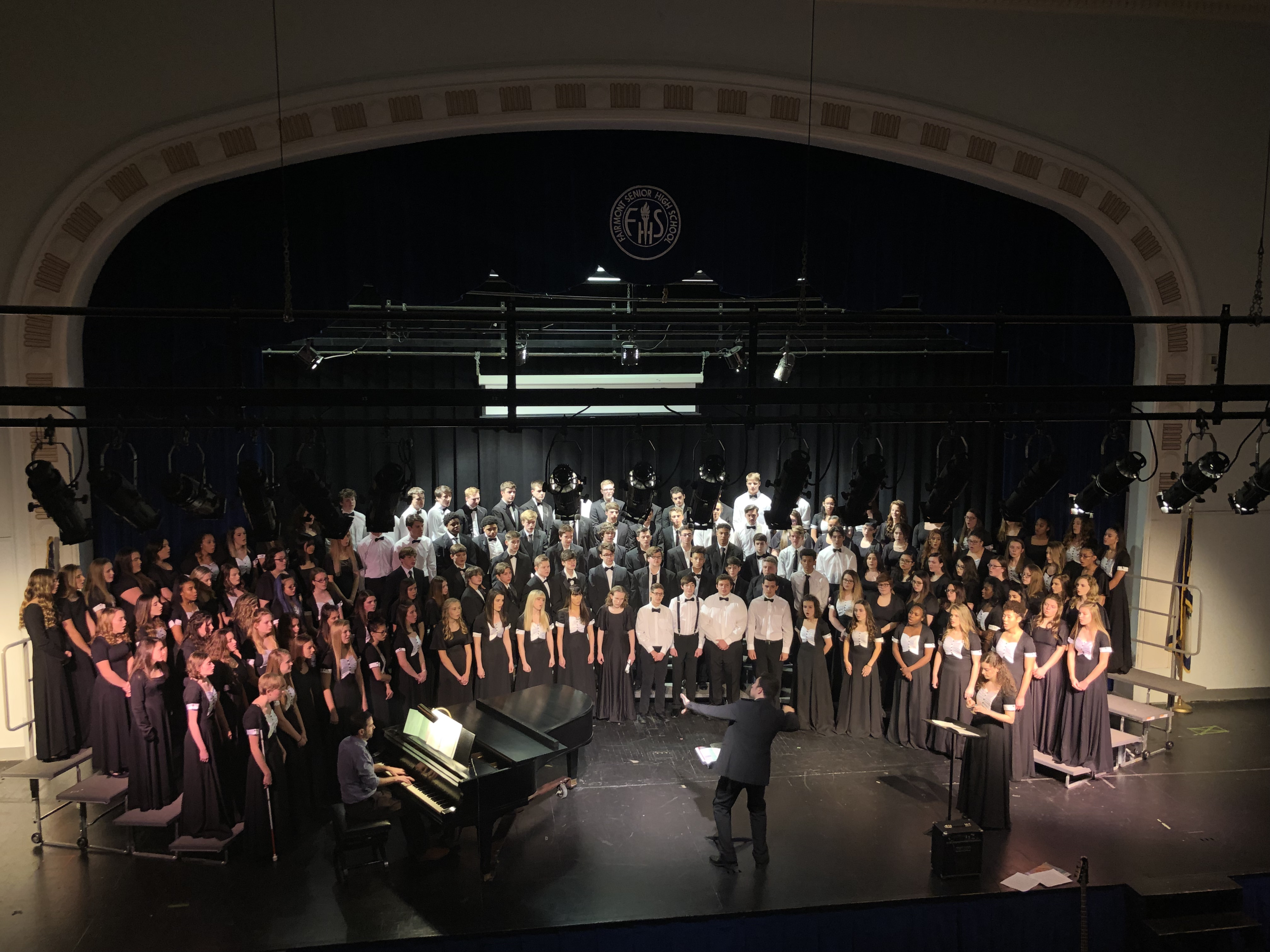
Fairmont Senior's choir performs in a concert at the school's auditorium in 2018.

Fairmont Senior has three choral groups: the Madrigals, women's ensemble, and men's ensemble. The full name of the school's Madrigals group is the Fairmont Senior Madrigal Chamber Choir, which is considered to be a renaissance style a cappella choir. The group was started by Doug Bunner in 1985; he taught at the school until his retirement in 2006. The group hosts an annual elimination dinner at the Fairmont Knights of Columbus, and the school presents the Madrigals's Yuletide Feast biennially (a tradition that started in 1985). The group has performed at other places, such as the current Fairmont Senior building, Meadowbrook Mall, West Virginia University Mountainlair, and the WorldStrides OnStage competition in Orlando, Florida.

=== Thespian program ===
Fairmont Senior offers a thespian program. Fairmont Senior's thespians group is known as the Fairmont Senior High School Thespians Troupe. Fairmont Senior's group has performed in different events, such as the West Virginia State Thespian Festival.

== Athletics ==
Fairmont Senior offers a number athletic opportunities to its students, such as baseball, softball, basketball, cross country, golf, cheer, football, volleyball, soccer, swimming, tennis, track, wrestling, and lacrosse.

=== State championship history ===
Boys' sports	State titles	Girls' sports	State titles
Baseball		Softball	
Boys basketball	1927, 1939, 1942, 1949, 1996, 2016, 2017, 2022, 2023	Girls basketball	1997, 2017, 2019
Cross country	1977, 1988, 1997, 1999, 2012, 2018, 2019	Cross country	1989, 1996, 1997, 1998, 2003, 2019, 2020
Golf	2019	Cheer	1991, 1992, 1999, 2020
Football	1903, 1907, 1924, 1929, 1946, 2018, 2020, 2021, 2023	Volleyball	
Soccer	2015, 2019, 2020	Soccer	
Swimming	1999, 2000, 2001, 2002, 2003, 2004, 2005, 2006, 2007, 2008	Swimming	2006
Boys tennis		Girls tennis	
Boys track		Girls track	1999
Wrestling	1960, 2023	Lacrosse	2008, 2009, 2010, 2011, 2012, 2016, 2019, 2021, 2022, 2023
Lacrosse	2009, 2018, 2019		

=== Mascot ===
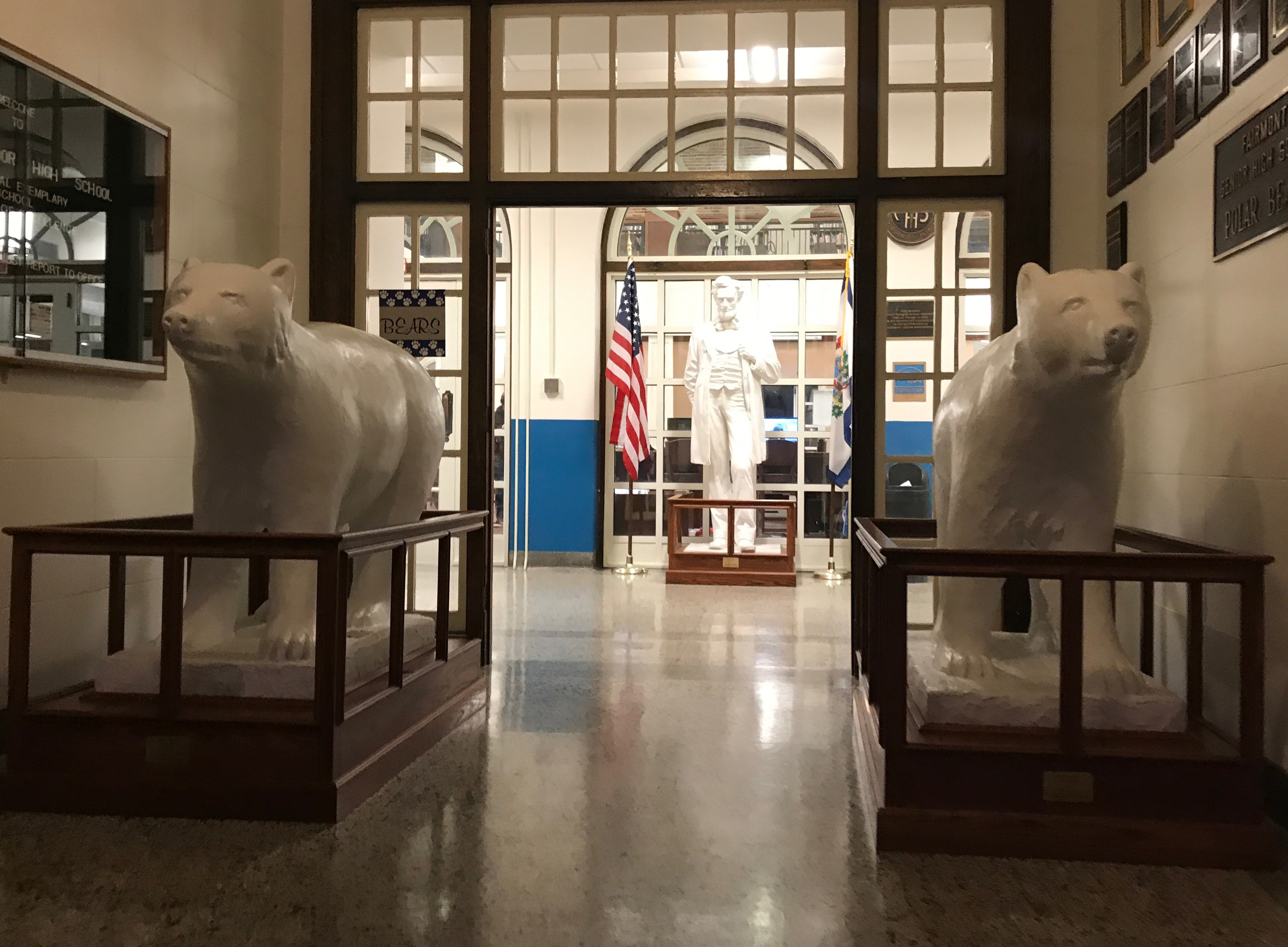
Two polar bear statues stand at the entrance of Fairmont Senior in 2017.

The mascot of Fairmont Senior is the Polar Bear. The name is a reference to Fairmont Senior's athletic teams who were known as "Ice's men" due to Fairmont Senior coach Frank Ice. Similarly, the mascot of West Fairmont Middle School, a Fairmont Senior feeder school, is the Polar Cubs or Polar Bears Cubs.

=== Rivalry ===
East Fairmont High School and Fairmont Senior have a football rivalry. Known as the East-West game Their football teams have met annually beginning on October 25, 1921, making the series the oldest continuously played football rivalry in West Virginia. Fairmont Senior leads the series with a record of (69-28-7) over East Fairmont. Fairmont Senior has won the last 17 matchups against East Fairmont. One main place they meet is East-West Stadium in Fairmont.

=== Awards and recognition ===
Fairmont Senior is considered an "above average" school by Niche. In 2020, the U.S. News & World Report ranked Fairmont Senior as 3380th in its national ranking, 10th in West Virginia, and 1st in Marion County.

Fairmont Senior received the 2010 Blue Ribbon honor, and in 2019, the school was recognized with the Champion of College Access and Success award for "efforts to make students aware of higher education opportunities after they graduate".

Math teacher Sarah Snyder was honored by President Barack Obama with the Presidential Award for Excellence in Mathematics and Science Teaching in 2016. The following year, Fairmont Senior English teacher Toni Poling was recognized as the 2017 West Virginia Teacher of the Year.

== Notable alumni ==
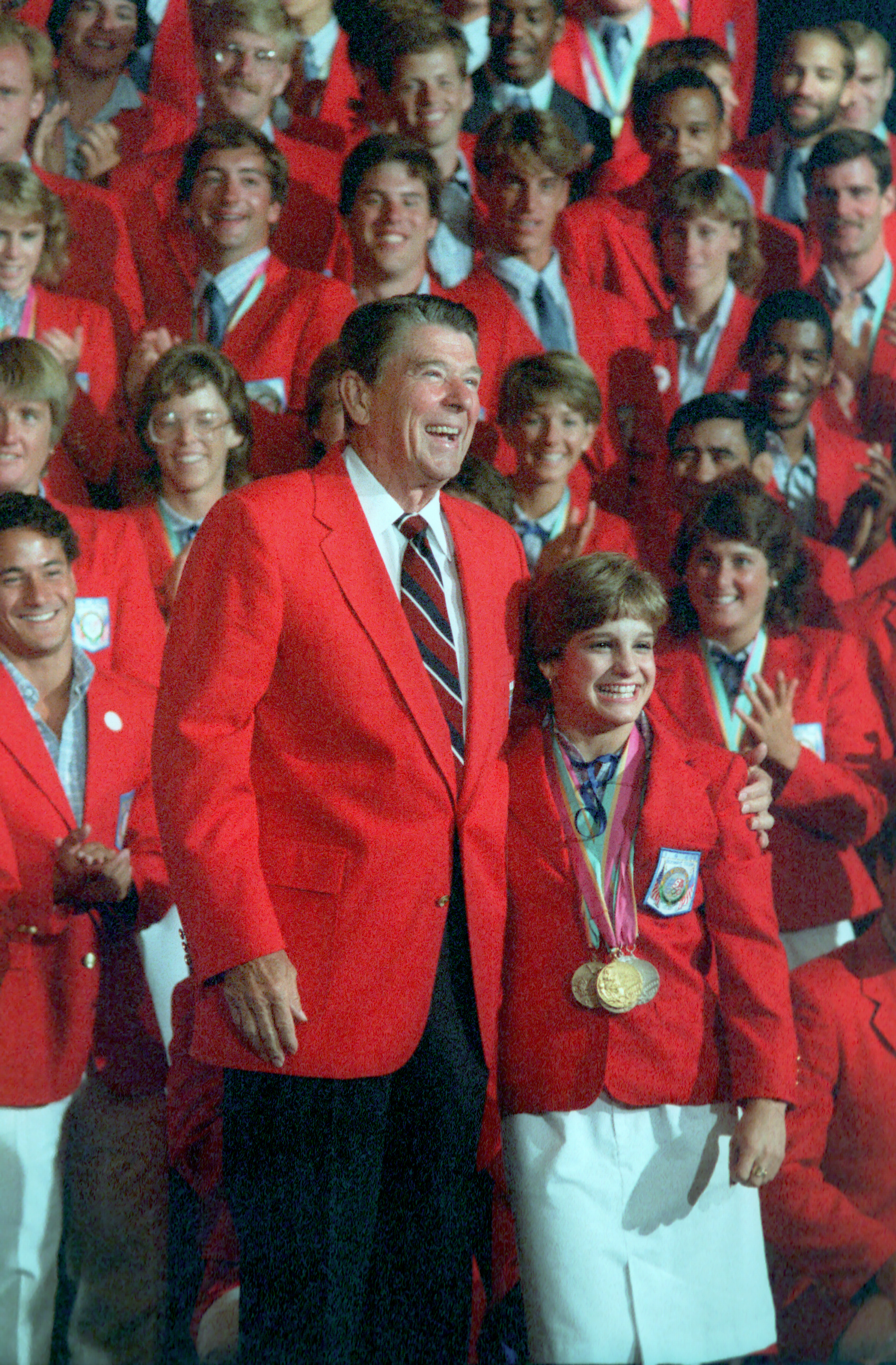
President Ronald Reagan and Mary Lou Retton with the U.S. Olympic Team in Los Angeles, 1984. Retton attended Fairmont Senior High School.

- Heather Bresch, CEO of Mylan Pharmaceuticals
- Jalen Bridges, professional basketball player in the National Basketball Association (NBA)
- Jim Delligatti, entrepreneur who created the Big Mac hamburger at McDonald's
- Frank Kendall Everest Jr., fighter and test pilot who was once known as "the fastest man alive"
- Zach Frazier, professional football player in the National Football League (NFL)
- Michael Garrison, former president of West Virginia University
- Rashod Kent, professional football player in the NFL
- Russ Meredith, professional football player in the NFL and member of the West Virginia House of Delegates
- Mary Lou Retton, gymnast, 1984 Summer Olympics gold medalist in all-around competition
- Darius Stills, college football player for the West Virginia Mountaineers
- Dante Stills, professional football player in the NFL

== See also ==
- List of National Register of Historic Places entries
