= Sixmile Island (Pennsylvania) =

Coordinates: 40°29′28″N 79°55′10″W

Sixmile Island is an alluvial island in the Allegheny River in Allegheny County in the U.S. state of Pennsylvania. Despite being shown as part of Sharpsburg borough on some maps, including from the Pennsylvania Department of Transportation, it is part of O'Hara Township. It is the location of Nancy Werner Park and lies across the river from Pittsburgh.
