= Dorseyville, Pennsylvania =

Unincorporated community in Pennsylvania, US

Coordinates: 40°34′37″N 79°53′19″W

- Unincorporated community
- Nickname: Crowtown
- Interactive map of Dorseyville, Pennsylvania
- Country: United States
- State: Pennsylvania
- County: Allegheny
- Township: Indiana
- Time zone: UTC-5 (EST)
  - Summer (DST): UTC-4 (EDT)

Dorseyville is an unincorporated suburb of Pittsburgh located in Indiana Township, Allegheny County, Pennsylvania, United States.

== History ==
Dorseyville was originally called "Crowtown" by farmers, but later named for the Dorsey family that lived on modern day Cedar Run Road. The Dorseyville fire hall, which held the Dorseyville Corn Carnival until the 2000s, was demolished and rebuilt in 2009 at a cost of $699,560. In 1880, a farm was built on old farm trail, which now goes by the address: 400 Meadow Springs Farm Ln, Pittsburgh, PA 15238. Dorseyville is also home to Hartwood Elementary School, which is ranked as the 22nd best elementary school in Pennsylvania.

== Demographics ==
Historical population
Census	Pop.	Note	%±
2023 (est.)	1,070

The United States Census Bureau defined Dorseyville as a census designated place in 2023.

== Places Of Interest ==
Trinity United Church Of Christ

The Trinity United Church Of Christ's earliest records date back to 1851 when it is believed to have been built. According to church history, some older members recall hearing stories of an earlier log church that stood where the church cemetery is now. No written records, however, can be found to verify that. Records show the Lutheran and Reformer Church, the predecessor to Trinity United, purchased 50 square feet of land along Saxonburg Boulevard for $2 in 1851. The first child was baptized in the church that year. Confirmation classes began in 1855 when five congregants became adult members of the church. The first wedding was held in 1856. The church eventually was renovated, and in 1876, members decided to build a new facility. An additional acre was purchased at the site that year to build the new church while the old one was converted into a four-room parsonage. The church also received its charter as a religious organization that year and was named The First German Evangelical Lutheran Trinity Congregation of Dorseyville. Services were conducted in German until 1887 when English became the language of evening services. In 1913, services were conducted in German and English on alternate Sundays and holiday services were conducted in both languages. In 1923, it switched its religious affiliation, joining the Evangelical Synod and becoming the Trinity Evangelical Church of Dorseyville. The name changed again in 1934 with a religious merger, and the church became Trinity Evangelical and Reformed Church of Dorseyville. In 1935, a chancel and two classrooms were added. Volunteers cut costs to build a parsonage by donating 321 hours in 1940. In response to a population boom, a brick educational building was built in 1957. That year brought another merger that formed the United Church of Christ. Eleven years later, Trinity officially became Trinity United Church of Christ.

Former Nike Center

In October 1956, “Nike P1-03” was constructed at the top of Charles Street, a year after it was acquired by the Department Of Defense, the center was home to 12 Nike Ajax/Nike Hercules launchers. The Center was used for the purpose of the assembly, launch, and control of guided missiles for defense against hostile aircraft. During the time of the deactivation, Pennsylvania Air National Guard 176th Artillery 2nd Missile Battalion was in control of the property. During the Department Of Defense use, several improvements were made at the former launch and control areas including barracks, family housing units, mess halls, generator buildings, transformers, missile assembly and test building warhead storage, building an operations shelter, frequency changing buildings and control pad, three underground missile storage structures, four radar towers, missile tracking, acquisition tracking, target ranging, target tracking bore sighting, mast assembly tower, high power acquisition radar, HIPAR building and tower, POL building, radar and battery control trailers with permanent interconnecting corridor, sentry box buildings, and acid storage shed, fueling station and neutralizing pit, JP fuel pad, an above ground fuel oil tank, underground fuel storage tanks, canine kennel water storage tanks, pump houses and sewage systems septic tank, dosing chamber, distribution boxes, sand filters, hypochlorinator shelter, and a chlorine contact tank. The last launch took place on March 1, 1974, and the control and launch sites were transferred from the department of defense to the control of another party in 1976. After the deactivation, the housing portion of the site continued to be used until its disposal to provide family housing for active military personnel in the Pittsburgh area. The land was sold to the Council Of Three Rivers American Indian Center, and now serves as its headquarters. In May 2000 two soccer fields were built at the former launch site, and as it is overgrown the site remains very much intact with buildings and fences. In April 2001, West Deer Creek Township started the deconstruction of all of the above ground hardware on the launch pad. The blue electrical switches and semicircular hose holders were cut off at the ground surface along with some pipes. The original barracks now serve as a community center, metal doors cover all of the magazines, during the winter the warhead building and assembly building are used to store picnic tables, and all of the underground facilities are filled with water.

Council Of Three Rivers American Indian Center

The Council Of Three Rivers American Indian Center (COTRAIC) became what it is in late 1969 and early 1970, when members of two Native American families met, they began discussing their situation, one which is common to all Natives: a sense of apathy, of "floating" in the mainstream population, being dispersed and isolated, denied native birthrights, discriminated against, deprived both culturally and otherwise, and of being looked upon as "others." In 1972 the COTRAIC incorporated as a nonprofit organization under the laws of the commonwealth of Pennsylvania. Today The COTRAIC has its headquarters located on the same 23 acre piece of land atop Charles street. Annually the organization invites anybody willing to come to enjoy their Pow-Wow celebration, with food, drinks, shops, and entertainment.
