= Bayernhof Music Museum =

Museum in O'Hara Township, Pennsylvania

Coordinates: 40.4984°N 79.9159°W

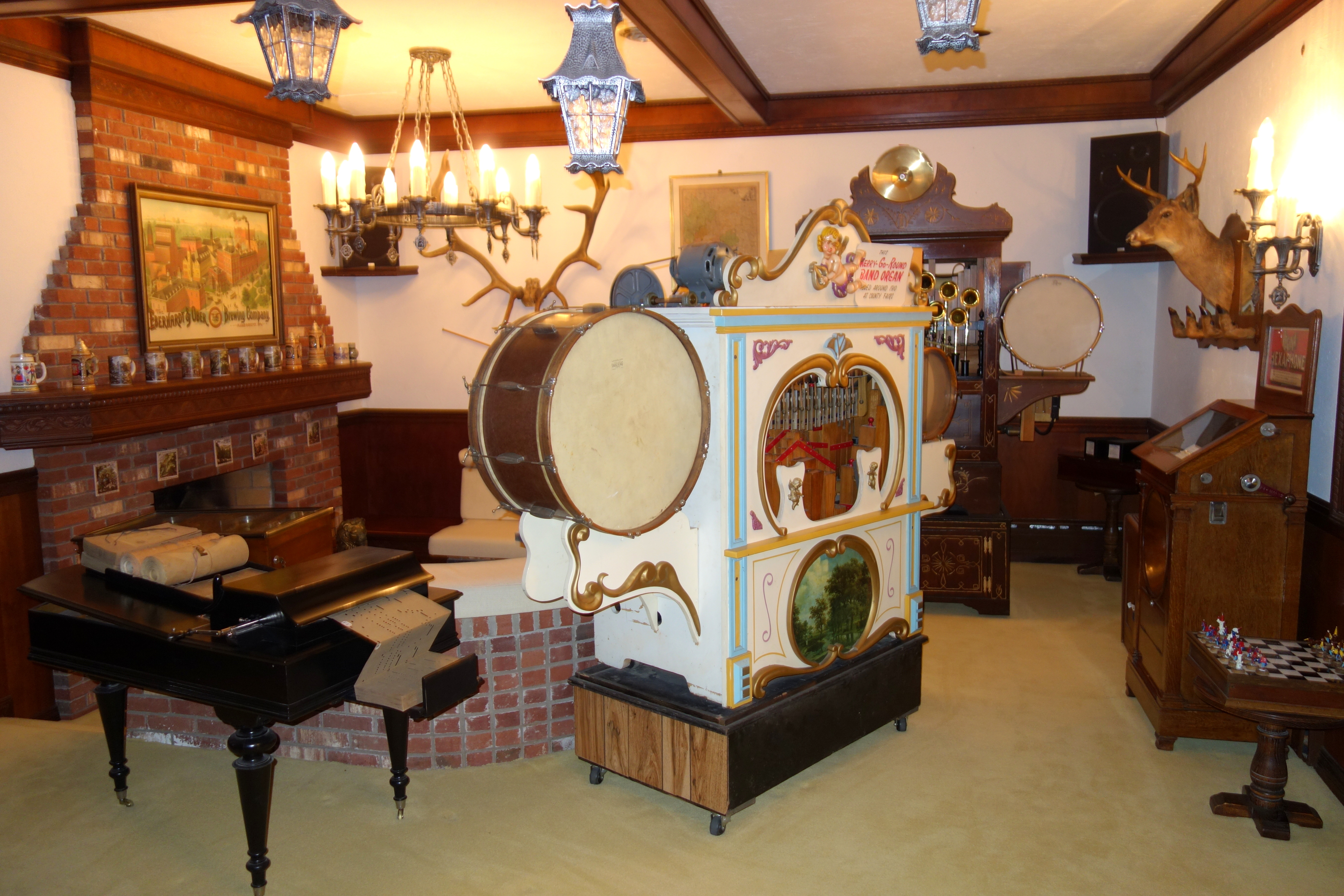
Bayernhof Music Museum

Bayernhof Music Museum features a major collection of automated musical instruments from the 19th and 20th centuries. Located six miles (10 km) northeast of downtown Pittsburgh in the suburb of O'Hara Township, Pennsylvania, it is housed in a German-style mansion sited on an 18-acre (73,000 m^{2}) dramatic overlook some 540 feet (160 m) above the Allegheny River Valley.

Bayernhof is the name of the mansion itself, a $4.2 million project completed in 1982 as a private residence by Charles Brown III (1935–1999), founder and CEO of Gas-Lite Manufacturing Company in Pittsburgh. The 19,000-square-foot (1,800 m^{2}) house includes a rooftop observatory, an indoor cave, a swimming pool with a 10-foot (3.0 m) waterfall, ten fireplaces, eight full baths, three powder rooms, three full-size kitchens as well as a completely restored copper still.

The museum was a directive of Mr. Brown's will, and it opened to the public in 2004.

== See also ==
- List of music museums
