= Allegheny County Workhouse =

Prison in Allegheny County, Pennsylvania

Coordinates: 40.4920°N 79.8655°W

The Allegheny County Workhouse was a prison that was located adjacent to the town of Blawnox, Pennsylvania. Its full name was "Allegheny County Workhouse and Inebriate Asylum". The facility was created to help alleviate the costs of housing inmates. The production of oil barrels was the major form of income from its opening until the end of the nineteenth century. The passage of repressive legislation, notably the Muehlbronner Act of 1897, would effectively end productive labor in Pennsylvania's penal facilities. The first inmates were received in 1869, and the facility closed in 1971.

The prison housed mostly inmates convicted of minor offenses. Many of those prisoners maintained a farm of about 1100 acres (445 ha), which contained apple orchards as well as many other crops and many different types of farm animals.
