= Porky Chedwick =

American radio personality

- Born: George Jacob Chedwick; February 4, 1918; Pittsburgh, Pennsylvania, U.S.
- Died: March 2, 2014 (aged 96); Pittsburgh, Pennsylvania, U.S.
- Other name: Craig Chedwick
- Spouse(s): Jeanie Chedwick; 4 children

George Jacob "Porky" Chedwick (February 4, 1918 – March 2, 2014) was an American radio announcer known to generations in Pittsburgh, Pennsylvania, as "The Daddio of the Raddio", "The Platter Pushin' Papa", "The Bossman", "Pork the Tork", and a host of other colorful nicknames. His career lasted from 1948 to shortly before his death in 2014.

== Early life ==
George Jacob Chedwick (he later informally changed his first name to "Craig") was born on February 4, 1918, in Homestead, Pennsylvania, one of ten children of Theodore Chedwick (d. 1970), a steelworker. George's mother died when he was still a child. His was a close-knit, culturally and racially diverse neighborhood, which he often compared to "a secluded island", where things such as one's skin color simply didn't matter. Before getting into radio, he worked odd jobs around Homestead-Munhall, including delivering newspapers as a young boy, later working as a sports "stringer" reporter for the newspaper, sorting mail for the local post office, and calling play-by-play sporting events at his alma mater, Munhall High School.

== Career ==
He began his career at WHOD in Homestead (which took the call letters WAMO — an acronym for the Allegheny, Monongehela and Ohio rivers — in 1956), when the low-power AM signed on, August 1, 1948. When he responded to an ad in a local paper, advertising for on-air talent at the new radio station, his popularity as a play-by-play announcer won him a 10-minute Saturday sports and music show. The music portion was gradually expanded, in response to the public's reaction. WHOD, known as "The Station of Nations," was created to serve the diverse European and eastern bloc immigrant population that worked the Pittsburgh area mills. Most of his young listeners, who turned an ear toward Chedwick's music and off-the-cuff rhymes and patter, had no idea that he was Caucasian. Years later, when the fact became apparent, the outcry from some parents, religious and civic leaders made him a local anti-hero, and he was banned from appearing in some neighborhoods. The suggestion that he was trying to corrupt the (white) youth of America was put to rest when he was commended by Senator Estes Kefauver for his work organizing youth baseball teams to combat juvenile delinquency. He even had a few youths remanded to his custody from juvenile court.

In spite of WHOD's low wattage (1,000 watts compared to 50,000 watts on KDKA.), Chedwick became Pittsburgh's "Pied Piper of Platter". By the early 1950s, black music record labels were hearing about the noise Chedwick was making in Pittsburgh with old R&B stock, so they began inundating him with new material. He introduced the new material to his "movers and groovers," never accepting payola though payola was the norm at the time. Still, oldies would dominate his playlist. Shortly after being honored by WAMO for his years of service in 1984, he was let go by the station. He would work at various other stations in the Pittsburgh market until executives from Sheridan Broadcasting (WAMO's parent company) asked him to come back in 1992.

== Health ==
For much of his life, Chedwick was plagued with impaired vision, which led him to the practice of wearing prescription eyeglasses with dark lenses, which also aided in hiding his crossed left eye. His vision-related problems ultimately robbed him of his ability to drive a car. In 1990, he was diagnosed with a large, benign brain tumor. When news broke of the diagnosis, it sent a shock throughout Pittsburgh and a national community of pioneer artists who still felt in his debt. Friends including Little Anthony, Hank Ballard, Lou Christie, Wolfman Jack, Johnnie and Joe, Bobby Comstock, The Marcels, The Vogues, and Bo Diddley organized a benefit concert to help shoulder the huge medical bill for the operation from which he fully recovered. The surgery was performed at West Penn Hospital and drew more than five thousand get-well cards from fans and other supporters. Some remaining money from the fund-raiser was put into a trust fund against the day when Chedwick would need long-term residential or hospice care. Not long after Chedwick's brain surgery, he also underwent a second operation to correct his crossed left eye, enabling him to see with clear lenses.

== Move to Florida and back ==
Chedwick and his wife Jeanie announced in June 2008 that they were moving to Florida. They completed their move from Pittsburgh's Brookline section to Tarpon Springs in August 2008. By Christmas, Porky returned to Pittsburgh and began to make appearances at oldies clubs, following his recovery. He eventually returned to Florida but hated the tranquil community of the trailer park, likening a stroll through it to "walking through a graveyard". He and his wife sold their property in July 2011 and immediately bought a house in the Brookline neighborhood of Pittsburgh, vowing never to leave the city of Pittsburgh again.

== Later years ==
On September 2, 2011, Chedwick returned to the air on WEDO in McKeesport, where he hosted a Friday program from 11AM to noon, eastern. His return to radio was captured by New York film maker Josh Gilbert. On October 26, 2011, Chedwick announced to his audience that management had told him that unless his radio show could secure some sponsors, the following week would be his last on WEDO. After another discussion with WEDO management a few days later, the October 26, 2011, issue of the Pittsburgh Post-Gazette reported that Chedwick had opted to discontinue the show, after only eight broadcasts.

The news reached veteran DJ Terry Lee, who had recently returned to local radio himself. Lee, who became one of Pittsburgh's top DJs in the mid-1960s by playing ballads he called "Music For Young Lovers" and hosting "Bandstand" style local shows in the 1970s, was appalled at the way Chedwick's situation at WEDO had been handled. Chedwick had just left WAMO Pittsburgh after 23 years, unhappy at being forced to follow the psychedelic/underground rock format the station had been programming. According to an aircheck of the show that Lee owns, all 30 of WIXZ phone lines were tied up for the four-hour show — all from listeners wanting to talk with Porky. Lee and Chedwick even had to beg people to stop coming to the radio station. The next day, members of the media and WIXZ listeners speculated that Chedwick had found a new radio home, but it was not the case.

On October 30, 2011, Lee announced that he wouldn't see Chedwick languish again, adding, "Without Porky, none of us (oldies DJs) would be here." At 4 p.m. (EST), November 11, 2011, from his Brookline home, Chedwick made his internet radio debut, beginning his show with "Breaking Up the House" by Tiny Bradshaw (1950). Shortly before Chedwick went live, Lee spoke on the network and said that Chedwick would do 4 to 6, every Friday, but that "he can stay on as long as he wants." After the second hour, Chedwick told his audience, "I'm feeling good! I'm gonna do another hour."

== Death ==
Chedwick made regular Sunday night appearances at a restaurant near his home. His last public appearance was six days before his death, at the fortieth and final Roots of Rock and Roll concert in Pittsburgh.

After being hospitalized just weeks before for surgery to correct a swallowing difficulty, Chedwick died on March 2, 2014, after complaining of chest pains. He walked into the hospital's emergency room under his own power, but died a short time later. He was 96.

== Honors ==
Chedwick has been recognized on the floor of the United States Senate for his pioneering contributions to radio and rock and roll, and countless times around Pittsburgh, including a day-long 50th anniversary oldies concert called "Porkstock" in 1998 at Three Rivers Stadium and another in 1999.

Chedwick was among a group of radio disc jockeys honored in the "Dedicated to the One I Love" exhibit at Cleveland, Ohio's Rock and Roll Hall of Fame and Museum in 1996. He was the only Pittsburgh DJ to be recognized in the Hall of Fame. At age 88, Chedwick celebrated his 58th anniversary on the air at the Hall of Fame's Alan Freed Radio Studio on August 12, 2006.
