= Blawnox, Pennsylvania =

Borough in Pennsylvania, US

- Borough
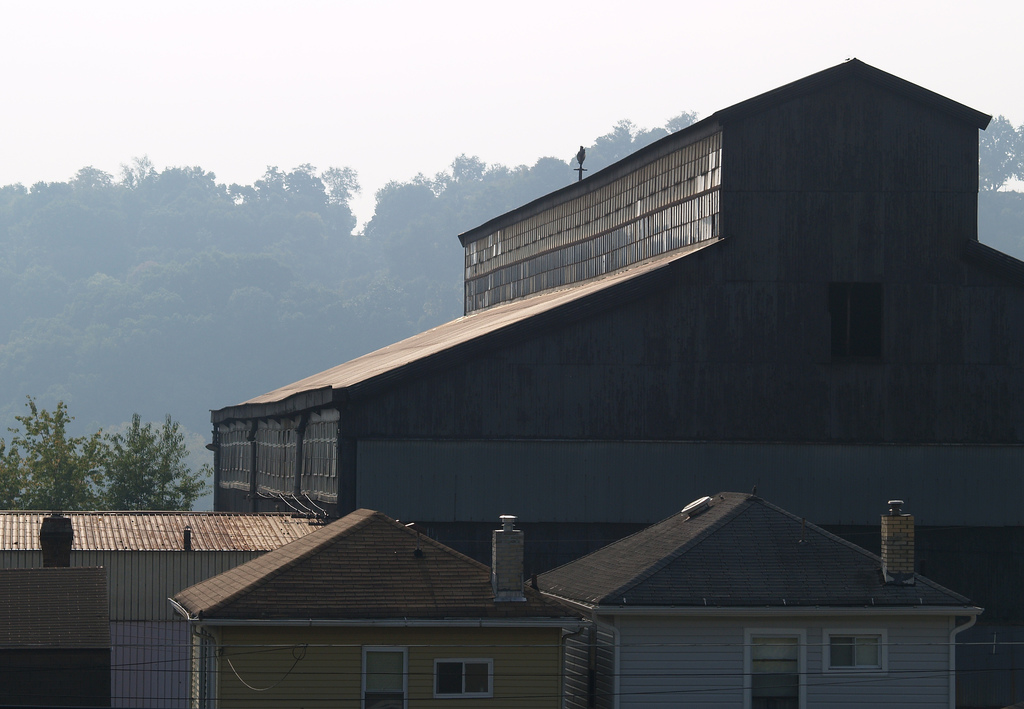
- An old factory in Blawnox
- Etymology: Blaw-Knox Steel Company
- Location in Allegheny County and the U.S. state of Pennsylvania.
- Coordinates: 40°29′33″N 79°51′40″W
- Country: United States
- State: Pennsylvania
- County: Allegheny
- Incorporated: Apr 4, 1925

Area
  - Total: 0.44 sq mi (1.14 km^{2})
  - Land: 0.30 sq mi (0.77 km^{2})
  - Water: 0.14 sq mi (0.37 km^{2})
- Elevation: 843 ft (257 m)

Population (2020)
  - Total: 1,454
  - Density: 4,905.0/sq mi (1,893.83/km^{2})
- Time zone: UTC-5 (EST)
  - Summer (DST): UTC-4 (EDT)
- ZIP code: 15238
- Area code: 412
- FIPS code: 42-07000
- School District: Fox Chapel Area
- Website: http://www.blawnox.com

Blawnox is a borough in Allegheny County, Pennsylvania, United States. The population was 1,454 at the 2020 census. It is part of the Pittsburgh metropolitan area.

== Etymology ==
The name Blawnox is derived from the Blaw-Knox Company, which had a manufacturing plant there providing much of the town's employment. Prior to this, Blawnox had been called Hoboken.

== History ==
The town was founded in the late 19th century, with the name Hoboken. Steel was the community's major industry, with the area being home to the Blaw Steel Co. and the Knox Welded and Pressed Steel Co. When the Blaw Steel Co. acquired the Knox Welded and Pressed Steel Co. in 1917, the company became known as the Blaw-Knox Steel Construction Co., and the size of Hoboken was expanded to the whole area spanned by the Blaw-Knox mill.

Blawnox was incorporated on April 13, 1925, from O'Hara Township.

== Geography ==
Blawnox is located at 40°29′33″N 79°51′40″W.

According to the United States Census Bureau, the borough has a total area of 0.4 square miles (1.0 km^{2}), of which 0.3 square miles (0.78 km^{2}) is land and 0.1 square miles (0.26 km^{2}), or 25.58%, is water. Its average elevation is 843 feet (257 m) above sea level.

=== Surrounding and adjacent communities ===
Blawnox is entirely surrounded by land to the north, northeast and west by the westernmost section of O'Hara Township. Across the Allegheny River, Blawnox runs adjacent with Penn Hills.

== Demographics ==
Historical population
Census	Pop.	Note	%±
1930	2,186		—
1940	2,162		−1.1%
1950	2,165		0.1%
1960	2,085		−3.7%
1970	1,907		−8.5%
1980	1,653		−13.3%
1990	1,626		−1.6%
2000	1,550		−4.7%
2010	1,432		−7.6%
2020	1,454		1.5%

As of the census of 2000, there were 1,550 people, 858 households, and 373 families residing in the borough. The population density was 4,771.6 people per square mile (1,842.3 people/km^{2}). There were 931 housing units at an average density of 2,866.0 per square mile (1,106.6/km^{2}). The racial makeup of the borough was 93.03% White, 1.03% African American, 0.06% Native American, 5.23% Asian, 0.19% from other races, and 0.45% from two or more races. Hispanic or Latino of any race were 0.65% of the population.

There were 858 households, out of which 15.6% had children under the age of 18 living with them, 29.4% were married couples living together, 10.3% had a female householder with no husband present, and 56.5% were non-families. 51.3% of all households were made up of individuals, and 19.1% had someone living alone who was 65 years of age or older. The average household size was 1.81 and the average family size was 2.68.

In the borough the population was spread out, with 14.5% under the age of 18, 6.9% from 18 to 24, 31.7% from 25 to 44, 25.0% from 45 to 64, and 21.9% who were 65 years of age or older. The median age was 43 years. For every 100 females, there were 86.7 males. For every 100 females age 18 and over, there were 83.9 males.

The median income for a household in the borough was $30,203, and the median income for a family was $43,500. Males had a median income of $31,450 versus $26,406 for females. The per capita income for the borough was $19,858. About 5.8% of families and 8.7% of the population were below the poverty line, including 9.5% of those under age 18 and 5.6% of those age 65 or over.

== Government and politics ==
=== Presidential Voting Results ===
Presidential Elections Results
Year	Republican	Democratic	Third Parties
2020	40% 315	57% 454	1% 13
2016	41% 296	54% 388	5% 33
2012	42% 283	56% 379	2% 15

== See also ==
- Allegheny County Workhouse, a former prison (1869–1971) near Blawnox.
