= Fox Chapel Area School District =

School district in Pennsylvania

Coordinates: 40°30′0″N 79°54′0″W

Fox Chapel Area School District (FCASD)

Location
- 611 Field Club Rd., Pittsburgh, PA 15238-2406 Allegheny County, Pennsylvania United States

District information
- Type: Public
- Motto: The Fox Chapel Area School District exists to maximize student learning, achievement, and growth through a focus on educating the whole student.
- Grades: K-12
- Established: 1958
- Accreditations: Middle States Association Commissions on Elementary and Secondary Schools
- Schools: Fox Chapel Area High School, Dorseyville Middle School, Fairview Elementary School, Hartwood Elementary School, Kerr Elementary School, and O'Hara Elementary School

Students and staff
- Students: 4,278
- Teachers: 354
- Staff: 577

Other information
- Website: www.fcasd.edu

Map of Allegheny County, Pennsylvania School Districts with Fox Chapel Area School District in light blue in northeast Allegheny County.

Fox Chapel Area School District is a public school district located in Allegheny County, Pennsylvania. It serves the boroughs of Aspinwall, Blawnox, Fox Chapel, and Sharpsburg, along with Indiana and O'Hara Townships. It is located approximately 12 miles from downtown Pittsburgh. The district has four elementary sites, a middle school, and high school. There are approximately 4,300 students enrolled in the school district.

== Schools ==
- Fox Chapel Area High School
- Dorseyville Middle School
- Fairview Elementary School
- Hartwood Elementary School
- Kerr Elementary School
- O'Hara Elementary School

== Enrollment ==
As of 2025, all schools within the school district have a total of 4,278 students enrolled, with demographics as follows:

By Ethnicity (2025)
Ethnicity	Percent of Student Body	
Asian	295	6.87%
White	3,335	77.63%
Multi-Racial	312	7.26%
Black or African American	153	3.56%
Hispanic	195	4.54%
American Indian/Alaskan Native	5	0.12%
Native Hawaiian or other Pacific Islander (not Hispanic)	1	0.02%

By Gender (October 2024)
Gender	Percent of Student Body
Male	54.5%
Female	45.6%

As of 2025, all the schools had 4,278 students enrolled with enrollment per school as follows:

Enrollment per School (2025)
School	Number of Students
Fox Chapel Area High School	1,361
Dorseyville Middle School	979
Fairview Elementary School	388
Hartwood Elementary School	388
Kerr Elementary School	434
O'Hara Elementary School	728

No demographic data was provided in the recent time period.

== SAT Testing ==
219 members (81%) of the 272 students in the FCAHS Class of 2024 took the SAT during their junior or senior year. Average scores on the SAT for the Fox Chapel Area High School Class of 2024:

- Evidence-based reading and writing: 613
- Math: 615

== Staff Statistics ==
Number of Professional Staff:

- Elementary: 170
- Secondary: 184

Master's or Doctorate Degrees or Equivalent:

- Elementary: 75%
- Secondary: 81%

Average years of teaching experience:

- Elementary: 18 years
- Secondary: 22 years
