= O'Hara Township, Pennsylvania =

Township in Pennsylvania, US

O'Hara Township, Allegheny County, Pennsylvania
- Township
- Township of O'Hara
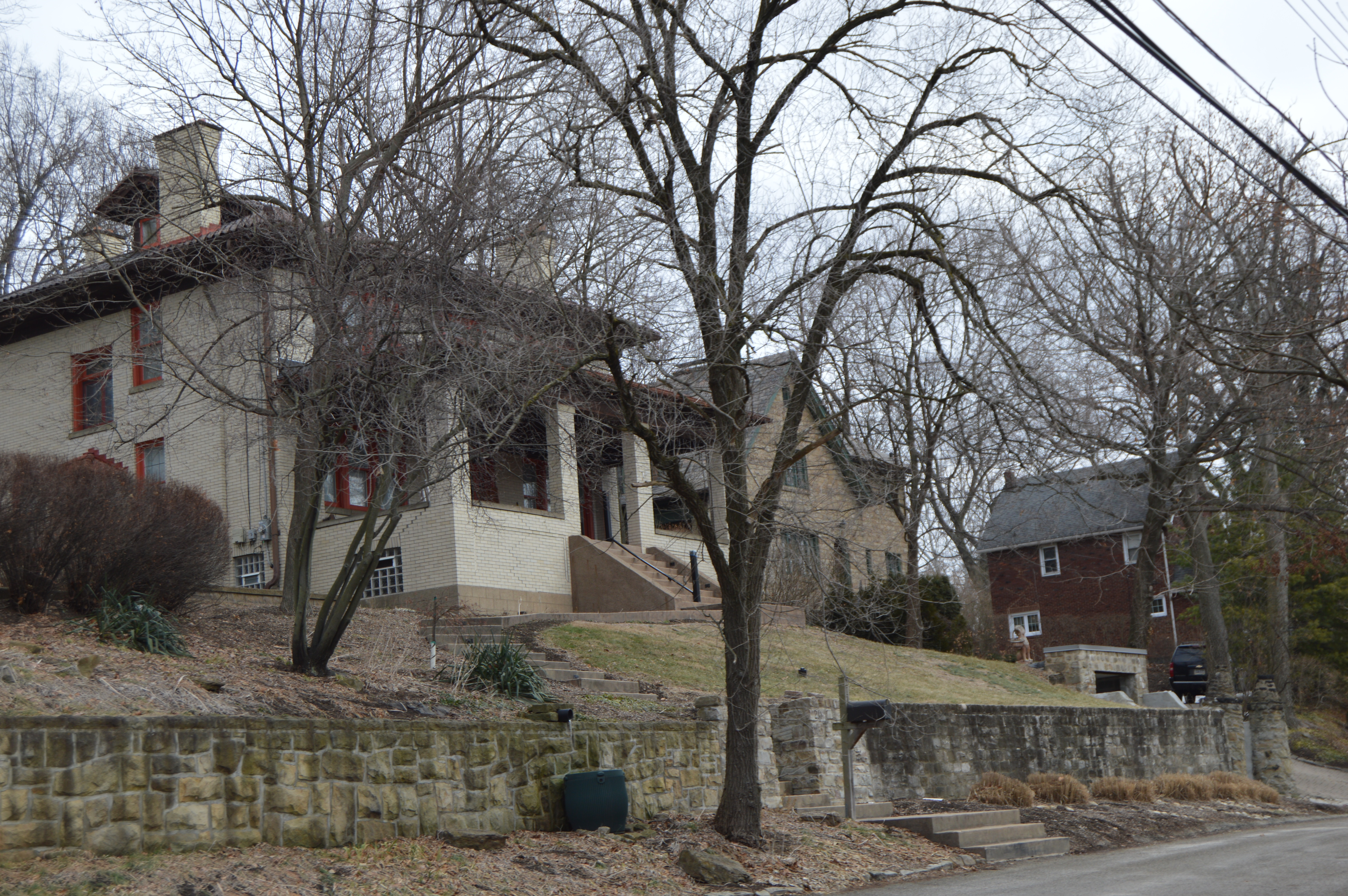
- Houses on Highland Terrace

- Logo

- Location within Pennsylvania Location within the United States
- Coordinates: 40°29′53″N 79°53′12″W
- Country: United States
- State: Pennsylvania
- County: Allegheny

Area
  - Total: 7.38 sq mi (19.11 km^{2})
  - Land: 7.02 sq mi (18.19 km^{2})
  - Water: 0.36 sq mi (0.92 km^{2})

Population (2020)
  - Total: 9,288 ▲
  - Estimate (2022): 9,075
  - Density: 1,210.2/sq mi (467.25/km^{2})
- Time zone: UTC-5 (Eastern (EST))
  - Summer (DST): UTC-4 (EDT)
- FIPS code: 42-003-56384
- Website: www.ohara.pa.us

O'Hara Township is a township with home rule status in Allegheny County, Pennsylvania, United States, six miles northeast of Downtown Pittsburgh. The community was long organized as a township, and retains "Township" in its official name, but adopted a home rule charter in 1973 (taking effect on January 5, 1976) and is no longer subject to the Pennsylvania Township Code. The population was 9,288 at the 2020 census.

It is named for James O'Hara, an early American industrialist in western Pennsylvania, and a Revolutionary War general.

== Geography ==
O'Hara Township is divided into five non-contiguous areas.

O'Hara Township is located at 40°29′52″N 79°53′12″W (40.498001, -79.886789). It consists of five non-contiguous areas, including Sixmile Island, with Sharpsburg, Aspinwall and Fox Chapel separating them. It is bordered by Shaler Township to the west, Harmar Township, Oakmont, and Verona to the east, and Sharpsburg, Aspinwall, and Blawnox to the south.

According to the United States Census Bureau, the township has a total area of 7.3 square miles (19 km^{2}), of which 7.0 square miles (18 km^{2}) is land and 0.3 square miles (0.78 km^{2}), or 4.22%, is water.

== Demographics ==
Historical population
Census	Pop.	Note	%±
1880	2,498		—
1890	3,402		36.2%
1900	3,101		−8.8%
1910	3,917		26.3%
1920	4,672		19.3%
1930	5,127		9.7%
1940	4,553		−11.2%
1950	5,768		26.7%
1960	8,681		50.5%
1970	9,209		6.1%
1980	9,233		0.3%
1990	9,096		−1.5%
2000	8,856		−2.6%
2010	8,407		−5.1%
2020	9,288		10.5%
2022 (est.)	9,075		−2.3%

As of the census of 2000, there were 8,856 people, 3,248 households, and 2,536 families residing in the township. The population density was 1,259.1 inhabitants per square mile (486.1/km^{2}). There were 3,381 housing units at an average density of 480.7 units per square mile (185.6 units/km^{2}). The racial makeup of the township was 95.25% White, 0.84% African American, 0.05% Native American, 3.04% Asian, 0.26% from other races, and 0.58% from two or more races. Hispanic or Latino of any race were 1.14% of the population.

There were 3,248 households, out of which 34.7% had children under the age of 18 living with them, 67.5% were married couples living together, 8.4% had a female householder with no husband present, and 21.9% were non-families. 19.9% of all households were made up of individuals, and 10.0% had someone living alone who was 65 years of age or older. The average household size was 2.64 and the average family size was 3.05.

In the township the population was spread out, with 25.6% under the age of 18, 3.5% from 18 to 24, 23.4% from 25 to 44, 27.0% from 45 to 64, and 20.5% who were 65 years of age or older. The median age was 44 years. For every 100 females there were 99.1 males. For every 100 females age 18 and over, there were 97.5 males.

The median income for a household in the township was $67,725, and the median income for a family was $77,594. Males had a median income of $58,125 versus $36,458 for females. The per capita income for the township was $33,356. About 2.7% of families and 3.6% of the population were below the poverty line, including 3.1% of those under age 18 and 5.7% of those age 65 or over.

== Government and politics ==
=== Presidential Elections Results ===
Presidential Elections Results
Year	Republican	Democratic	Third Parties
2020	36% 2,301	62% 3,900	1% 66
2016	41% 2,182	58% 3,130	.01% 49
2012	49% 2,614	50% 2,692	.01% 51

=== Township Council ===
- Cassandra Ross Eccles, Fifth Ward, President
- Paul L. Cullen, At-Large
- Shamus Petrucelli, At-Large
- Richard S Hughs, First Ward
- George Stewart, Second Ward
- Mike Hammill, Third Ward, Vice-President
- Olivia T Payne, Fourth Ward

== Services ==
The township has two volunteer fire departments that are responsible for portions of the township: Pleasant Valley VFD (Station 217) and Parkview VFD (Station 218). Parkview VFD also provides emergency medical services for the entire township through Parkview EMS (Station 180).

The Police Department (3300 units) is supervised by Police Superintendent Jay R. Davis and maintains a full-time police department

The Human Services Department is the home of the Township Social Services Coordinator, Jalen Byrd. This individual is charged with assisting the Township Police Department and other Township Departments if they believe an individual may need the assistance of social services. Residents may also seek the assistance of the Social Services Coordinator. Help with social services may include drug and alcohol treatment, mental health treatment, hoarding treatment and obtaining food and shelter.

The local Emergency Management Agency for O'Hara Township consist of one Coordinator (James Farringer) and two Deputy Coordinators (Thomas Polczynski and Thomas Heilmann).

== Education ==
K–12 public school students attend the Fox Chapel Area School District.

== Culture ==
O'Hara is home to both the Bayernhof Music Museum and the RIDC O'Hara Research and Business Park.
