= Burrell =

Burrell may refer to:

== Businesses ==
- Burrell Communications Group, an American advertising agency
- Burrell & Son, a former Scottish tramp shipping company
- Charles Burrell & Sons, a British engineering company

== Education in the United States ==
- Burrell College of Osteopathic Medicine, Las Cruces, New Mexico
- Burrell Academy, Selma, Alabama
- Burrell Normal School, Florence, Alabama, a former private school for African Americans
- Burrell High School, Lower Burrell, Pennsylvania
- Burrell School District, Pennsylvania, United States

== Places ==
=== United States ===
- Burrell, California, a ghost town
- Burrell, former name of Burrel, California, an unincorporated community
- Burrell Township, Decatur County, Iowa
- Burrell Township, Armstrong County, Pennsylvania
- Burrell Township, Indiana County, Pennsylvania

=== Elsewhere ===
- Burrell, variant spelling of Boorlo, the Noongar name for Perth, Western Australia
- Mount Burrell, a town and mountain in New South Wales, Australia
- Burrell Creek, British Columbia, Canada

== People ==
- Burrell (surname)
- Burrell (given name)

== Other uses ==
- Burrell baronets
- Burrell Collection, Glasgow, Scotland, a museum
- Burrell Memorial Hospital, Roanoke, Virginia, United States, a former African-American hospital on the National Register of Historic Places
- Burrell Memorial Observatory, on the campus of Baldwin Wallace University, Berea, Ohio, United States

== See also ==
- Lower Burrell, Pennsylvania, United States
- Upper Burrell Township, Pennsylvania, United States
- Burrells, Cumbria, England, a hamlet
- Burel (disambiguation)
- Burrel (disambiguation)
