= Burrell (surname) =

Burrell is a surname. Notable people with the surname include:

- Anne Burrell (1969–2025), American celebrity chef
- Bill Burrell (1936–1998), American football player
- Boz Burrell (1946–2006), English musician
- Charles Burrell (disambiguation), multiple people
- Daisy Burrell (1892–1982), English actress
- Dave Burrell (born 1940), American jazz instrumentalist
- David Burrell (1933–2023), American Roman Catholic priest and theologian
- David H. Burrell (1841–1919), American industrialist, inventor, and philanthropist
- Dawn Burrell (born 1973), American long jumper
- Ellen Burrell (1850–1938), American mathematics professor
- Ervin Burrell, character from the TV show The Wire
- Ezra A. Burrell (1867–1922), Republican politician from Idaho
- Gary Burrell (1937–2019), American businessman
- Gibson Burrell (born 1948), British organizational theorist and professor
- Henry Burrell, (1873–1945) Australian naturalist
- Sir Henry Burrell (1904–1988), Royal Australian Navy admiral
- Isaac D. Burrell (1865–1914), African-American physician
- Jeremiah Burrell (1815–1856), American lawyer and judge
- John Burrell (disambiguation), multiple people
- Kenny Burrell (born 1931), American jazz guitarist
- Kim Burrell (born 1972), American gospel singer
- Leroy Burrell (born 1967), American track and field athlete
- Louie Burrell (1873–1971), English artist
- Luther Burrell (born 1987), English rugby union player
- Martin Burrell (1858–1938), Canadian politician
- Maryedith Burrell (born 1952), American actress, comedian, film and television producer, writer and documentarian
- Ode Burrell (born 1939), American football player
- Orville Richard Burrell (born 1968), better known as Shaggy, Jamaican-American reggae musician
- Parker Burrell (1937–2010), politician in Manitoba, Canada
- Pat Burrell (born 1976), American baseball player
- Paul Burrell (born 1958), butler to Diana, Princess of Wales
- Percy Jewett Burrell (1877–1964), American author and director of historical and civic pageants
- Peter Drummond-Burrell, 22nd Baron Willoughby de Eresby (1782–1865), English nobleman
- Philip "Fatis" Burrell (1954–2011), Jamaican record producer
- Prudence Burns Burrell (1916–2012), African American nurse
- Rhano Burrell (born 1966), Twin brother to Rheji Burrell, American Multi-platinum Songwriter and Producer of House Music, R&B, Hip Hop and Pop genres. Kung Fu Instructor
- Rheji Burrell (born 1966), Twin brother to Rhano Burrell, American Multi-platinum Songwriter and Producer of House Music, R&B, Hip Hop and Pop genres. Kung Fu Instructor
- Richard Burrell, British television producer
- Richard Burrell (swimmer) (born 1959), British swimmer
- Roy A. Burrell (born 1952), American politician
- Sandy Burrell (born 1955), Scottish football player
- Scott Burrell (born 1971), American basketball player
- Stanley Kirk Burrell, or his stage name MC Hammer (born 1962), American rapper
- Tom Burrell, (born 1939), American advertising agency founder and chairman emeritus
- Ty Burrell (born 1967), American actor
- William Burrell (1861–1958), Scottish shipping magnate and art collector
