= Byron Lewis =

American advertising executive (born 1931)

Byron Eugene Lewis Sr.
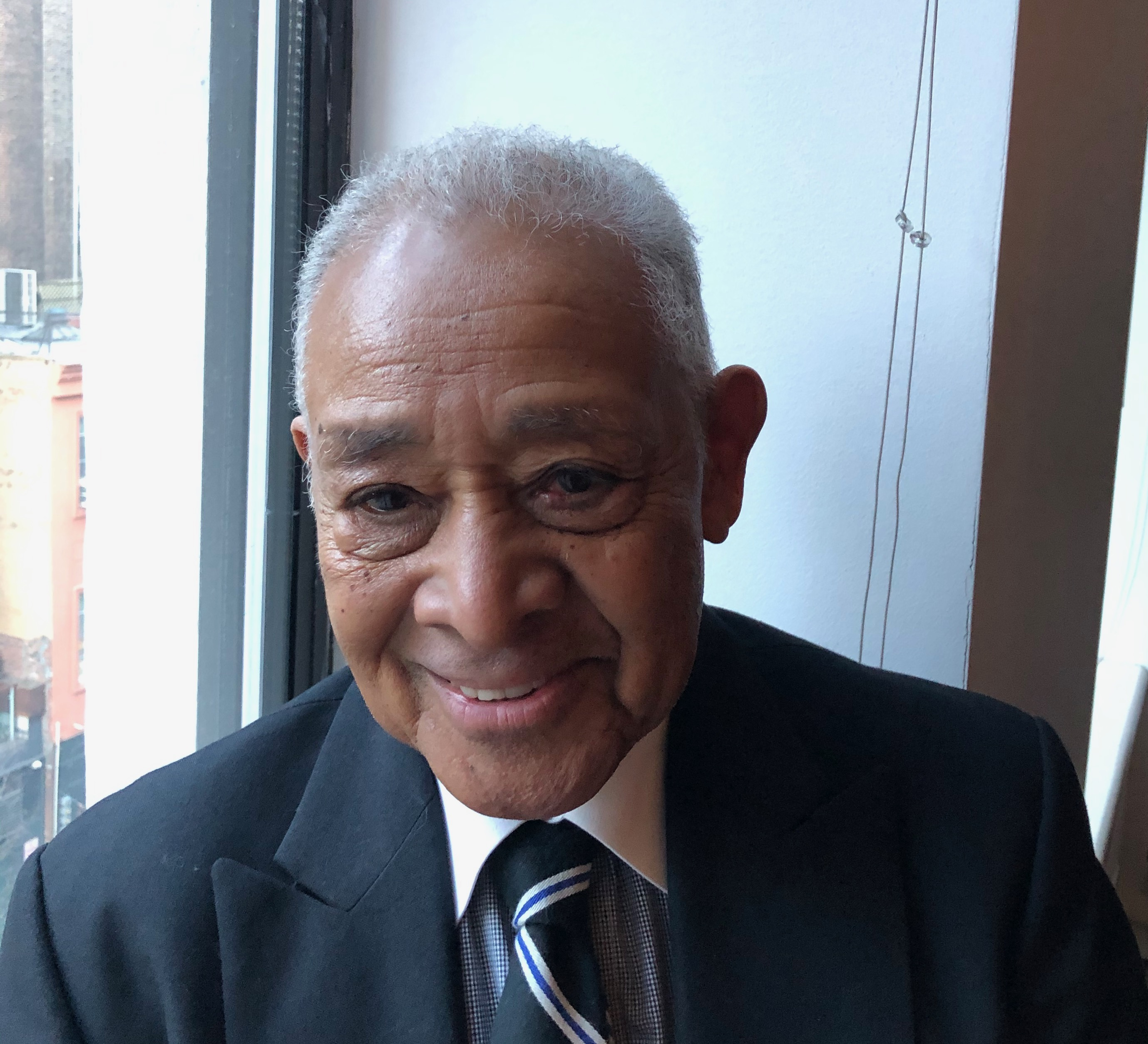
- Born: December 25, 1931 (age 94); Newark, New Jersey, U.S.
- Education: Long Island University
- Occupation: Retired advertising executive
- Years active: 1960s–2012
- Known for: Founder of UniWorld Group, Inc.
- Spouse: Sylvia Wong Lewis (m. 2011) (second wife)
- Children: Byron E. Lewis Jr.

Byron E. Lewis Sr. (born December 25, 1931) is an American advertising executive, entrepreneur and pioneer of multicultural marketing. He is the founder and chairman emeritus of UniWorld Group, one of the oldest and largest African-American-owned advertising agencies in the United States.

He was referred to by The New York Times as "the original Black media king," Lewis was instrumental in opening the eyes of major brands like Avon and Mars Candy, as well as the entertainment industry, to the buying power of African American consumers. Lewis came up with “The Diapers” ad for Lincoln Navigator, a national automotive account aimed for the first time at the urban Black middle class.

Summing up his career in a 2022 interview with journalist Craigh Barboza, Lewis said, “What I found was major corporations, and most white people, had never thought of Blacks as consumers." Before serving in the United States Army in the 1950s, Lewis graduated from Long Island University where he pledged Omega Psi Phi, the Black national college fraternity. He is a member of its hall of fame.

In 2000, Lewis sold a 49% stake in UniWorld to the British advertising giant WPP for an undisclosed amount. When he retired in 2012, he sold his remaining stake to Motorola entertainment marketing head Monique Nelson and her family.

== Early years and education ==
Lewis was born in Newark, New Jersey. His father, Thomas Eugene Lewis, was an orphan from northern Connecticut with roots in the Cape Verde Islands, who ran a house painting and handyman business, employing his sons and local laborers. He also picked vegetables on Long Island and New Jersey truck farms. His mother, Myrtle Evelyn Allen, from Galveston, Texas, was a domestic worker, and worked part-time at a school cafeteria. She was also a Queens borough election worker for decades.

Lewis spent much of his childhood in Far Rockaway, Queens. When his family moved to Jamaica, Queens, he attended Shimer Junior High School and John Adams High School. He also attended church, and credits the Rev. Charles Carrington at Brooks Memorial Methodist Church as his first mentor. The reverend got Lewis involved in theater, choir, community service and the Boy Scouts. Later, Lewis would fund a sound system at the church in memory of his mother.

To pay for college and help his family, Lewis worked as a busboy at Gertz department store in Jamaica. At Long Island University, he completed his studies in 1953, earning a diploma in journalism a year ahead of schedule. He later pursued graduate work in public relations at New York University.

After LIU, Lewis was drafted into the U.S. Army, becoming part of the first wave of Black soldiers to fully integrate the armed forces. He served until 1955. He said he experienced common prejudice and Jim Crow racism, especially at Fort Knox, Kentucky and Fort Benning, Georgia. Lewis was stationed at Fort Dix, New Jersey, but his main post was Fort Richardson, in Anchorage, Alaska, where he was on ski patrol.

Soon after leaving the Army, Lewis held a job as a social worker on the Lower East Side of Manhattan, where he worked with people from a variety of cultural backgrounds, including Black, Latino, Italian, and Jewish families.

== Career ==
=== Media ===
Lewis got his start in Harlem working on Black-run publications. Between 1961 and 1969, he was the advertising director for Citizen Call, a newspaper founded by Wall Street financier John Paterson, who was the publisher. He also solicited ads for Tuesday magazine. Both were short-lived because the critical white ad revenue needed to support Black media was nonexistent.

A publication co-founded by Lewis, The Urbanite, was conceived as a sophisticated literary magazine for the “New Negro.” Featuring stories by Langston Hughes, Lorraine Hansberry and LeRoi Jones and photography by Roy DeCarava and Hugh Bell, it covered music, fashion, sports and the arts. The magazine's theater columnist was James Baldwin.

The Urbanite folded in 1961 after just three months when it ran out of money. Its $30,000 investment came from Irving Burgie, a songwriter for Harry Belfonte who wrote the hit “Day-O” in the 1950s. Regarding his expertise on the Black consumer market, Lewis told The New York Times in 2021, “I spent a decade in the trenches learning how to get Black magazines, newspapers, radio and television stations going. I became a teacher and a salesman.”

AT&T was an early client when he moved into advertising in 1969, with Lewis starting out working on community initiatives. He then persuaded its executives to underwrite a documentary about the direct line of communication between the Black church and community. “This Far by Faith” aired during AT&T's annual show on PBS, per Lewis's suggestion. He handled the film's 1977 premiere at the American Film Institute Theater and a reception that drew Black leaders, including mayor-ministers from several markets. The film is in the AT&T archives.

Lewis's next broadcast project was the 1974 Black radio soap opera "Sounds of the City." Lewis said credits the show with saving UniWorld from going out of business in the mid-1970s. Food conglomerate Quaker Oats was a sponsor on the project.

Lewis hired Lorraine Hansberry's cousin, Shauneille Perry, one of the first Black women to direct an off-Broadway play, to create “Sounds of the City.” The live daily show about a Chicago family gave needed roles to future Black acting royalty, Ossie Davis and his wife, Ruby Dee (who was working as an operator). The production also included Robert Guillaume, who appeared in the hit sitcom Soap, before starring in the Soap spinoff Benson, from 1979 to 1986.

UniWorld produced “Sounds of the City” and created the adjoining ad campaign featuring Aunt Jemima syrup and Uncle Ben's rice, among other Quaker Oats products.

=== UniWorld Group ===
Founded by Lewis in 1969, UniWorld was one of a handful of Black-owned ad agencies to emerge in the post-civil rights era. UniWorld, along with Burrell Communications and Mingo-Jones Advertising, helped legitimize Blacks “as equal consumers and equal citizens,” according to Lewis.

When MGM and Stax Records hired Lewis in 1971 to promote the Black action movie Shaft, Lewis proposed that the key to the campaign was talking directly to Black folks in an authentic, colloquial voice. Lewis created a series of radio spots around one of the soundtrack's most memorable lyrics: “They say this cat Shaft is a bad mother / Shut your mouth / But I’m talkin’ ’bout Shaft / Then we can dig it.” He also organized an elaborate multi-city promotional tour with advance screenings and after-parties where people from the local Black communities mingled with the film's cast and crew. On hand were director Gordon Parks, star Richard Roundtree and composer Isaac Hayes, whose “Theme from Shaft” won the Academy Award for best original song. Lewis spent months on the road promoting the movie. Lewis later said, in reference to his marketing strategy for the film, “I put the whole campaign in major markets talking to Black consumers ... It was about word of mouth, and where does the word of mouth come from on this project? The barbershops, hair salons and on the streets.” This strategy involved plastering major urban areas with the Shaft movie poster, designed by Bill Allen, UniWorld's first creative and art director.

After taking over the national general-market account for Burger King in the mid-1980s, UniWorld produced its first television commercials. The ads, featuring the slogan, “We may not be the world’s No. 1. fast-food place; it just tastes that way," resulted in one of the biggest six-month sales spikes in the company's history.

In 1995, Lewis landed another general-market account for the candy maker 3 Musketeers, which was the largest assignment ever awarded to a Black-owned agency. UniWorld's television and magazine ads for 3 Musketeers featured a Black musketeer, as Lewis proposed, and a humorous theme.

Between 1991 and 1996, UniWorld went from doing $60 million to $133 million in annual business. In 2003, that figure rose to $233 million. The agency's entertainment division turned out nationally televised specials, including the first Black Oscars, a gala held in Los Angeles in 1989, which Lewis produced with Albert L. Nellum. The event was hosted by Bernie Casey and awards went to, among others, Eddie Murphy, Forest Whitaker and Spike Lee.

Its Washington, D.C. office, UWG-DC, was run out of a stately home Lewis purchased that later became known as part of the Mansion on O Street. Rosa Parks was a guest. In 1970, after acquiring “America’s Black Forum” from friend-colleague Walker Williams and his business partner, John G. “Jack” Gloster, UniWorld Entertainment began producing the only syndicated Black TV news show. Lewis installed his son, Byron Jr., as a writer and producer. The talent included Julian Bond, Janet Langhart, Juan Williams, James Brown, Armstrong Williams, Charles Ogletree, Deborah Mathis and Ed Bradley of “60 Minutes.”

“America’s Black Forum” drew a million weekly viewers across 70-plus markets. Its guest list ran the gamut from newsmakers to activists and celebrities. Lewis Sr. ran the program from 1970 to 2007, then sold it to Black Enterprise CEO Earl Graves.

UniWorld's foray into film included marketing big-studio productions such as Glory, Malcolm X, Boyz n the Hood and Amistad, as well as working with various Hollywood talent like director John Singleton. In 1997, Lewis became founder and owner of the first Black film festival, originally called the Acapulco Black Film Festival. AT&T, HBO and Ford were sponsors. In 2002, the festival was sold to Jeff Friday and rebranded as Film Life's American Black Film Festival.

=== Political work ===
Lewis worked on the 1970 campaign of Newark's first Black mayor, Kenneth Gibson, and has created public service announcements aimed at health, education, poverty and other issues affecting communities of color.

In 1971, he was invited by poet Amiri Baraka to be the co-director of the National Black Political Convention in Gary, Indiana, the first Black political convention held since Reconstruction. Lewis oversaw all media and communications. More than 10,000 people attended. The speakers included Black Panther Party co-founder Bobby Seale, U.S. presidential candidate Shirley Chisholm, Nation of Islam leader Minister Louis Farrakhan, Coretta Scott King and Betty Shabazz.

Lewis enlisted support for the convention from friends like publisher John Johnson, corporate clients and show business people. Isaac Hayes, James Brown and Harry Belafonte performed. Comedian Dick Gregory spoke to the audience about issues of policing and healthcare.

In a scene from Nationtime: Gary, director William Greaves’s 1972 film (re-released in 2020) documenting the convention, Lewis told the crowd the organizers had credentialed 500 new outlets from around the world who “came to witness how we take care of our business.”

In 1976, his company became the first advertising agency to provide radio and press coverage of both the Democratic and Republican national conventions. Later, during the 1984 elections, Lewis worked on Rev. Jesse Jackson's historic presidential campaign, which was seen as an effort to shake up the left. Jackson was the first Black man to run for the White House.

== Personal life ==
Lewis is married to Sylvia Wong Lewis (formerly Sylvia Smith Isabel), a journalist and graduate of Smith College. They met in a buffet line at a media sponsors dinner in Brooklyn for the West Indian Day Parade in the early 1990s. Sylvia was publisher-editor of the Caribbean American News, a free community newspaper. They talked about the challenges that Black and Caribbean newspapers faced proving their circulation in order to attract major advertisers. They developed a longterm friendship before marrying in 2011 in Harlem. The ceremony was officiated by the former New York Mayor David Dinkins, a close friend of theirs.

Byron has one son from a previous marriage: Byron Eugene Lewis Jr.

== Recognition ==
During the 1970s, Lewis was chosen by the State Department to promote advertising and national brand-building strategies in Africa and traveled to Sudan, Kenya, Ivory Coast, Nigeria and Ghana.

With Lewis at the helm, UniWorld received more than 100 advertising awards. The honors came from the Association of National Advertisers (ANA), the American Advertising Federation (AAF) and Communications Excellence to Black Audiences (CEBA), among others.

Lewis has been inducted into the Advertising Hall of Fame of the American Advertising Federation, the Omega Psi Phi fraternity Hall of Fame and the AdColor Hall of Fame.

In 2013, he was interviewed by TheHistoryMakers, the Library of Congress’s largest archive of Black America’s legacy. He was given the A.G. Gaston Lifetime Achievement Award from Black Enterprise as well as entrepreneurial awards from Medgar Evers College, the University of the West Indies and Target Market News. He has an honorary doctorate from Adelphi University.

Lewis served on the board of trustees for the Jackie Robinson Education Foundation, the Apollo Theater Foundation, American Institute for Public Service, Phoenix House Foundation and New York City Sports Commission. He was on the Metro Board of Governors for the U.S. Olympic Committee and is on the board of his alma mater, Long Island University. In 2008, he provided the concept and initial funding for the school’s entrepreneur institute.

In March 2022, a gift deed was signed by a major cultural organization to acquire Lewis’ archives, including his papers, photos and objects.
