= Jeremiah Burrell =

American lawyer and judge

Jeremiah Murry Burrell (September 1, 1815 – October 1, 1856) was a lawyer and judge in western Pennsylvania, of whom three areas were named for.

In 1835, he started his career as a lawyer in the Westmoreland County seat of Greensburg, and around 1839 bought the rights to the newspaper, Pennsylvania Argus, which he used to promote his political views as editor. He was receiving national attention for his fiery debates by the early 1840s.

By 1844, he was a surrogate debating for presidential candidate James K. Polk. He served three terms in the Pennsylvania House, until 1848,

He further continued his legal and political career as judge of the Tenth Judicial District of Pennsylvania in 1847, which he held until 1855.

On September 13, 1855, he was appointed judge of the Territorial District of Kansas by President Franklin Pierce, and arrived in court in December 1855, when he had to fight for the right to sit on the bench.

Burrell suffered from malaria, and returned to Greensburg in 1856. He later died of the sickness on October 1, 1856, aged 41.

Today, townships in Indiana County (Burrell), Armstrong County (Burrell), and Westmoreland County (Lower Burrell and Upper Burrell) bear his name.
