= Walter Burrell =

Walter Burrell may refer to:

- Walter Burrell (1777–1831), Member of Parliament (MP) for Sussex 1812–31
- Sir Walter Burrell, 5th Baronet (1814–1886), British barrister and freemason, Conservative MP for New Shoreham 1876–85
- Sir Walter Burrell, 8th Baronet, of the Burrell baronets

== See also ==
- Burrell (disambiguation)
