= William Burrell (disambiguation) =

William Burrell was a Scottish merchant.

William Burrell may also refer to:

- Sir William Burrell, 2nd Baronet, English antiquarian
- Bill Burrell, American football player

== See also ==
- Burrell (surname)
