= Bavand Karim =

Iranian-American multi-media artist and filmmaker

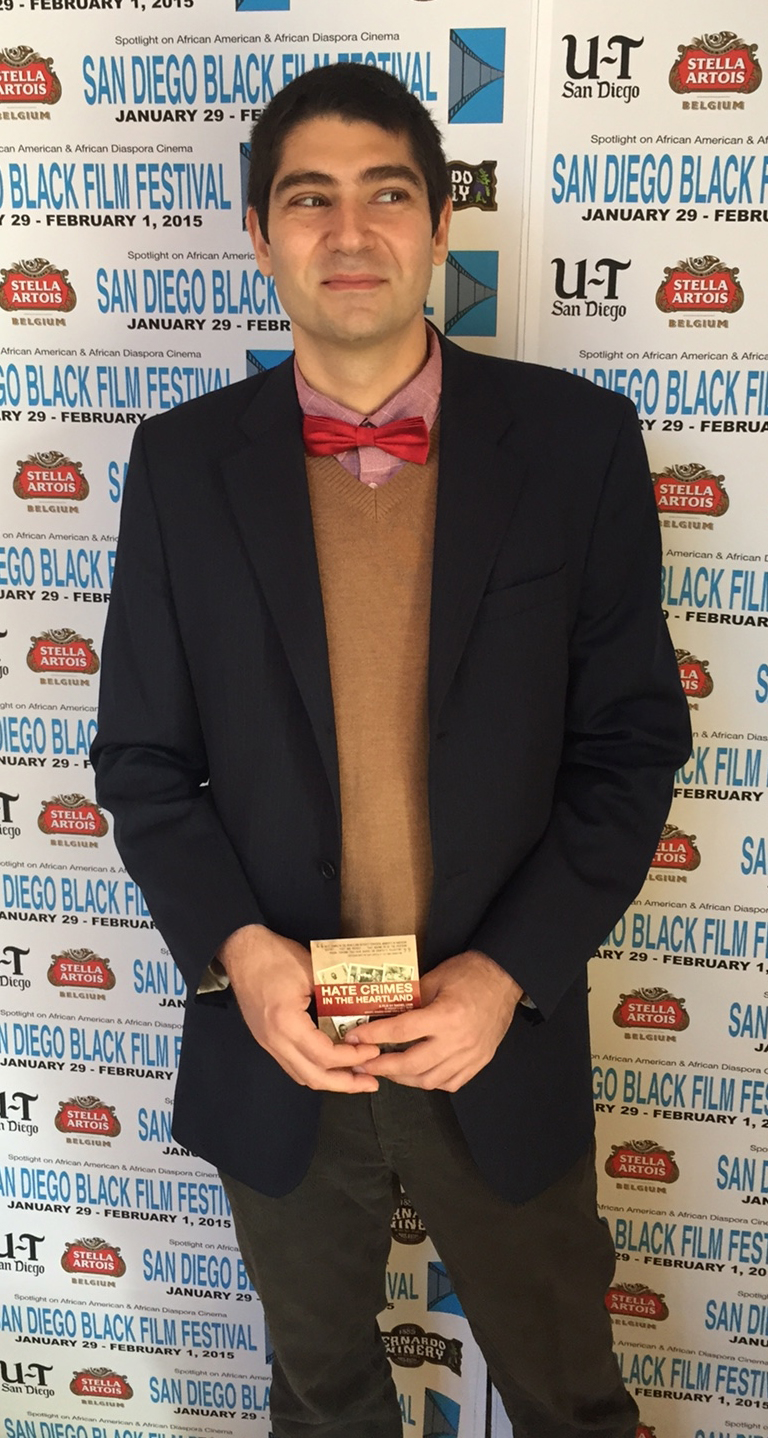
- Karim at the 2015 San Diego; Black Film Festival
- Born: Bavand Karimzadeh; 10 February 1979 (age 47)
- Occupation: Writer · Director · Producer
- Years active: 2007 - present
- Website: bavandkarim.com

Bavand Karim (born Bavand Karimzadeh, February 10, 1979) is an Iranian-American multi-media artist and filmmaker from Dallas, Texas.

== Education ==
Karim attended J.J. Pearce High School in Richardson, Texas. He received the degree of Master of Fine Arts in Cinema and Television from Meadows School of the Arts at Southern Methodist University in 2010.

== Film and television ==
Karim's first original feature documentary, Nation of Exiles, screened internationally in Brazil, Italy, France, Spain, and the U.K. His 2014 film, Hate Crimes in the Heartland, won the Paul Robeson Award for Best Feature Documentary at the Newport Black Film Festival. Karim's film and television credits include Spider-Man: Homecoming, Captain America: The Winter Soldier, Knight of Cups, Maps to the Stars, WACO, and SMILF.

Karim is the executive producer of the original television series, Dingo Suede: Private Detective, which received the 2014 Cincinnati Cable Access Blue Chip Award for Best Entertainment Program. He also wrote and produced the organic lifestyle program Dig In DFW, which was broadcast on FOX 4 in Dallas, and Ronnie & The Others, a Cincinnati-based talk show. He also produced four seasons of Sing That Thing, a New England regional vocal competition, on WGBH.

Karim owns the independent production studio Be Positive Pictures, and is a producer for the Emmy Award-winning documentary production company Lioness Media Arts. In 2014 he joined the visual and media arts program at Emerson College as assistant professor.
