= Burrel (disambiguation) =

Burrel may refer to:

- Burrel, Albania, city in northern Albania
- Burrel, California, unincorporated community in Fresno County, California
- Rey Za Burrel, Gundam character

== See also ==
- Burrell
