= New Kensington–Arnold School District =

School district in Pennsylvania

New Kensington-Arnold School District
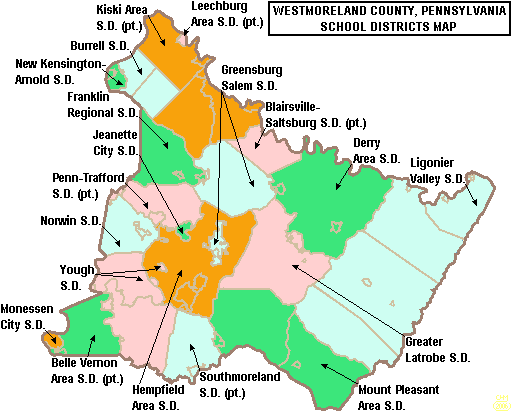
- Map of Westmoreland County, Pennsylvania school districts with New Kensington–Arnold School District in green in northwest Westmoreland County

Address
- 701 Stevenson Blvd New Kensington, Westmoreland County, Pennsylvania; United States

District information
- Type: Public

Other information
- Website: www.nkasd.com

The New Kensington–Arnold School District is a small, suburban, public school district serving the cities of Arnold and New Kensington, located in northern Westmoreland County in the U.S. state of Pennsylvania. The New Kensington–Arnold School District encompasses approximately 5 square miles (13 km^{2}). According to 2000 federal census data, it served a resident population of 20,400. By 2010, the District's population declined to 18,265 people. In 2009, the District residents’ per capita income was $16,285, while the median family income was $36,720. In Westmoreland County, the median household income was $50,736. In the Commonwealth, the median family income was $49,501 and the United States median family income was $49,445, in 2010. The educational attainment levels for the New Kensington–Arnold School District population (25 years old and over) were 89.4% high school graduates and 15.4% college graduates. The district is one 17 public school districts in Westmoreland County and one of the 500 public school districts of Pennsylvania.

According to the Pennsylvania Budget and Policy Center, 66.1% of the District's pupils lived at 185% or below the Federal Poverty Level as shown by their eligibility for the federal free or reduced price school meal programs in 2012. In 2013, the Pennsylvania Department of Education, reported that 44 students in the New Kensington–Arnold School District were homeless.

The Westmoreland Intermediate Unit IU7 provides the District with a wide variety of services like: specialized education for disabled students; state mandated training on recognizing and reporting child abuse; speech and visual disability services; criminal background check processing for prospective employees and professional development for staff and faculty.

== Schools ==
New Kensington–Arnold School District operates 4 schools:

- Roy A. Hunt Elementary School - (grades 3–6)
- H.D. Berkey School (grades 1–2)
- Martin School (grades preschool and kindergarten)
- Valley Junior Senior High School (grades 7–12)

High school students may choose to attend the Northern Westmoreland Career and Technology Center for training in the construction and mechanical trades. For the 2014–15 school year, 86 resident students chose to enroll in public charter schools and cyber charter schools, rather than attend the district's schools.

In 2014 due to declining enrollment several district schools were closed or consolidated/realigned

- Greenwald Memorial School (grades K–3) (closed 2014)
- Valley Middle School (grades 6–8) (closed 2014)
- Fort Crawford School (grades K–3) (closed 2014)

== Extracurriculars ==
New Kensington–Arnold School District offers a wide variety of clubs, activities and an extensive sports program.

=== Sports ===
The District funds:

HS Boys

- Baseball V&JV- AAA
- Basketball - AAA
- Football - AA
- Golf - AAA
- Soccer - AA
- Swimming and Diving - AA
- Tennis - AA
- Track and Field - AAA
- Wrestling - AA

HS Girls

- Basketball - AAA
- Soccer (Fall) - AA
- Softball - AA
- Swimming and Diving - AA
- Girls' Tennis - AA
- Track and Field - AA
- Volleyball - AA

Middle School Sports

Boys

- Baseball 7th & 8th grade
- Basketball
- Football
- Wrestling

Girls

- Basketball
- Softball
- Volleyball - 7th & 8th

According to PIAA directory July 2012
