= Chipper Harris =

American basketball player

Personal information
- Born: August 30, 1962 New Kensington, Pennsylvania, U.S.
- Died: May 26, 2018 (aged 55)
- Listed height: 6 ft 1 in (1.85 m)

Career information
- High school: Valley (New Kensington, Pennsylvania)
- College: Robert Morris (1980–1984)
- NBA draft: 1984: 7th round, 148th overall pick
- Drafted by: Kansas City Kings
- Position: Point guard / shooting guard

Career history
- 1985: New Jersey Jammers

Career highlights
- ECAC Metro Co-Player of the Year (1984); First-team All-ECAC Metro (1984); ECAC Metro tournament MVP (1983)
- Stats at Basketball Reference

Chester E. "Chipper" Harris Jr. (August 30, 1962 – May 26, 2018) was an American basketball player, best known for his college career at Robert Morris University in Pennsylvania, where he was the ECAC Metro Conference co-Player of the Year for the 1983–84 season.

Harris came to Robert Morris (RMU) in 1980 after a high school career at Valley High School in his native New Kensington, Pennsylvania. He led the school to the 1979 Pennsylvania state championship. At Robert Morris, Harris teamed with backcourt mate Forest Grant to lead the Colonials from a 3–17 record in their freshman years to back-to back NCAA tournament appearances the next two seasons. Harris, a defensive standout, unofficially led the nation in steals for three successive seasons from 1982–1984 (the NCAA began officially recording the statistic two years later). Harris was the Most Valuable Player of the 1984 ECAC Metro tournament (now the Northeast Conference) and in his senior season was named first-team all-conference and co-player of the year with Robert Jackson of St. Francis and Carey Scurry of Long Island. He left RMU as the school's all-time leader in points and steals (although his scoring mark was eclipsed ten years later). He an inaugural member of the Robert Morris Ring of Honor.

Following the close of his college career, Harris was drafted by the Kansas City Kings in the seventh round (148th pick) of the 1984 NBA draft, but did not play in the National Basketball Association. He played a season for the New Jersey Jammers in the United States Basketball League (USBL), and spent some time playing overseas.

Harris died on May 26, 2018, of complications from diabetes at the age of 55.
