= Burel =

Burel may refer to:

- Burel Hill, ice-free hill at Desolation Island, South Shetland Islands, Antarctica
- Burel Valley, Sub-Balkan valley in western Bulgaria
- Clara Burel (born 2001), French tennis player
- Léonce-Henri Burel (1892–1977), French cinematographer
- Burel, a traditional textile originating from Portugal

== See also ==
- Burrel, Albania, city in northern Albania
- Burrell (disambiguation)
