= Byerly House =

Historic house in Pennsylvania, United States

- U.S. National Register of Historic Places
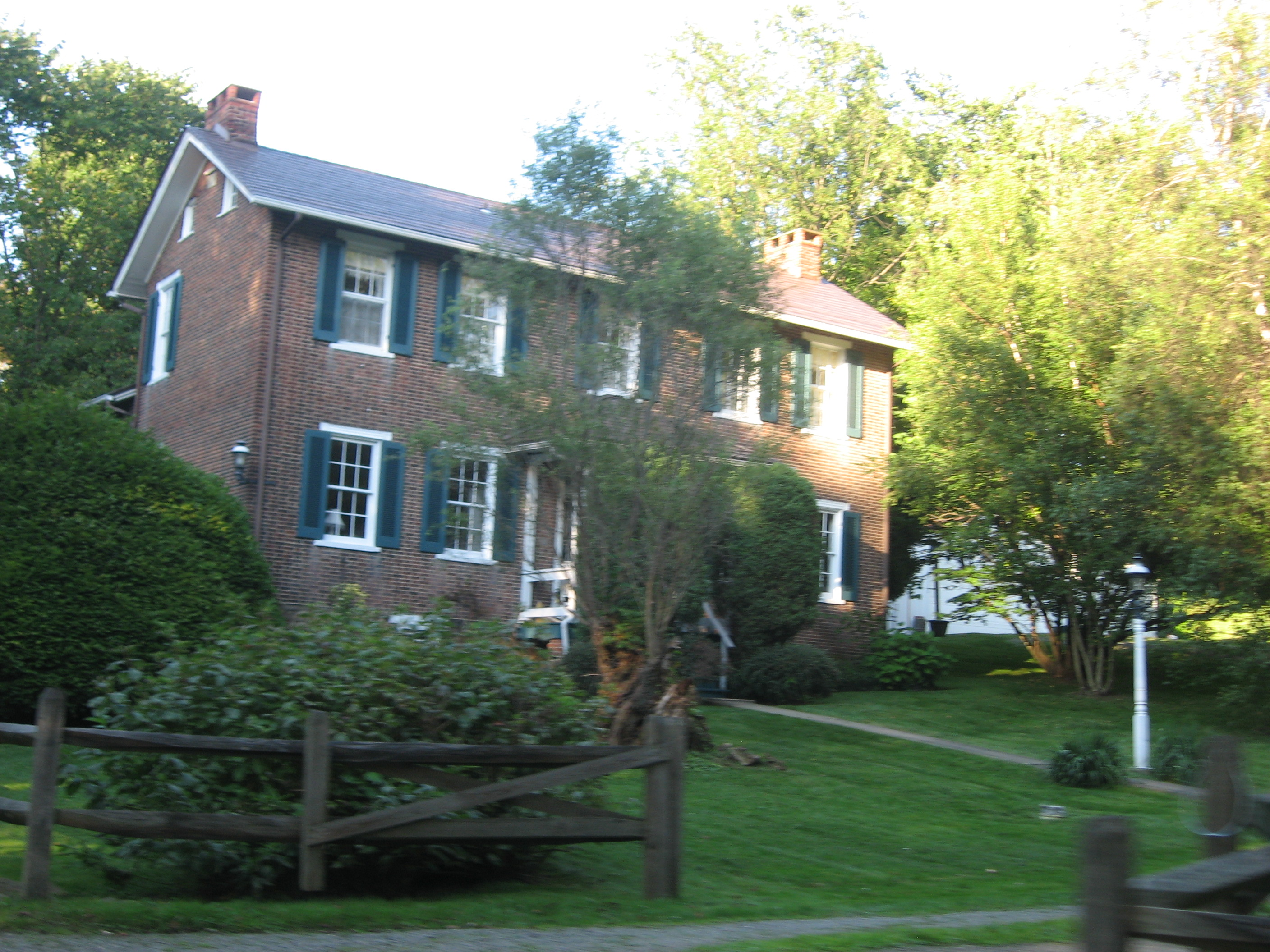
- Roadside view

- Location within Pennsylvania Location within the United States
- Location: 115 Menk Rd., east of New Kensington, Upper Burrell Township, Pennsylvania
- Coordinates: 40°33′14″N 79°41′2″W
- Area: 0.4 acres (0.16 ha)
- Built: c. 1835, 1842
- Architectural style: Greek Revival, Other, Post Colonial
- NRHP reference No.: 85001567
- Added to NRHP: July 18, 1985

Byerly House, also known as the Best House, is a historic home located in Upper Burrell Township, Westmoreland County, Pennsylvania. The main section was built in 1842, with a rear ell dated to the 1830s. The main section is a two-story, brick dwelling, five bays wide and on a stone foundation. It has a gable roof and three chimneys. It has a one-story, rear ell consisting of two rooms. It is a vernacular dwelling with Post Colonial and Greek Revival design elements.

It was added to the National Register of Historic Places in 1985.
