= Ethics in America =

American television series

Ethics in America was a ten-part television series, originally aired from 1988 to 1989, in which panels of leading intellectuals from various professions discussed the ethical implications of hypothetical scenarios, which often touched on politics, the media, medicine, and law. The panels were moderated by law professors from leading law schools.

The series was developed and hosted by former CBS News president Fred Friendly and produced by Columbia University Seminars on Media and Society (later renamed Fred Friendly Seminars). It was funded in part by the Annenberg/CPB Project. The executive producer was Cynthia McFadden. The series was originally broadcast on PBS. In 2006, Fred Friendly Seminars produced a new series, Ethics in America II, which also aired on PBS.

== Episodes ==
The original series included ten one-hour episodes:

- "Anatomy of a Hostile Takeover (Ethics in Business)"
- "Do Unto Others (Personal Ethics)"
- "Does Doctor Know Best? (Ethics in Medicine)"
- "The Human Experiment (Ethics in Scientific Research)"
- "The Politics of Privacy (Ethics in Journalism)"
- "Public Trust, Private Interests (Ethics in Government)"
- "To Defend a Killer (Ethics in Criminal Law)"
- "Truth on Trial (Ethics in Civil Law)"
- "Under Orders, Under Fire (Ethics in the Military, Part I)"
- "Under Orders, Under Fire (Ethics in the Military, Part II)"

== Panelists ==
Panelists who appeared on the series included:

- Floyd Abrams, American attorney and expert in Constitutional law
- R. W. Apple, Jr., associate editor at The New York Times
- Warren Buffett, chairman of Berkshire Hathaway Inc.
- Joseph A. Califano, Jr., former General Counsel of the U.S. Army, special assistant to the Secretary of Defense, and Secretary of Health, Education, and Welfare, among other government posts
- Stanley M. Chesley, Ohio trial lawyer
- Vincent T. DeVita, pioneer physician in the field of oncology
- Geraldine Ferraro, member of the United States House of Representatives from the State of New York
- Barney Frank, member of the U.S. House of Representatives from Massachusetts
- Stephen Gillers, professor at the New York University School of Law, considered an expert in legal ethics
- Newt Gingrich, member of the U.S. House of Representatives from Georgia, and Speaker of the House from 1995 to 1999
- Rudy Giuliani, United States Attorney for the Southern District of New York, businessman, and politician
- James Goldsmith, British billionaire, businessman and founder of the short-lived Referendum Party in the United Kingdom
- Ellen Goodman, American journalist and Pulitzer Prize-winning syndicated columnist
- Katharine Graham, publisher of The Washington Post
- Jeff Greenfield, television journalist and author
- Peter Jennings, television news anchor
- Jeane Kirkpatrick, American ambassador and former foreign policy adviser to President Ronald Reagan
- C. Everett Koop, former U.S. Surgeon General
- Arthur L. Liman, lawyer and partner at the New York law firm Paul, Weiss, Rifkind, Wharton & Garrison
- Robert R. Merhige, Jr., federal judge for the U.S. District Court for the Eastern District of Virginia
- Robert C. Maynard, journalist
- James F. Neal, defense attorney and former federal prosecutor
- Marilyn Hall Patel, judge presiding in the U.S. District Court for the Northern District of California
- T. Boone Pickens, oil businessman
- Arnold S. Relman, professor emeritus of medicine and social medicine at Harvard Medical School and editor of the New England Journal of Medicine
- Antonin Scalia, Associate Justice of the Supreme Court of the United States
- Brent Scowcroft, U.S. National Security Advisor under Presidents Gerald Ford and George H. W. Bush
- Alan K. Simpson, Republican U.S. Senator from Wyoming
- Louis Stokes, member of the U.S. House of Representatives from Ohio
- Lester Thurow, dean of the MIT Sloan School of Management and author of numerous bestsellers on economic topics
- Mike Wallace, television journalist
- Faye Wattleton, the first African-American and youngest president ever elected to Planned Parenthood
- William C. Westmoreland, commander of American military operations in the Vietnam War from 1964 to 1968 and U.S. Army Chief of Staff from 1968 to 1972
- Tim Wirth, U.S. Senator from Colorado
- Anna Marie Quindlen, journalist

== Moderators ==
- Arthur R. Miller
- Charles Ogletree
- Charles Nesson
- Lewis B. Kaden

== Awards ==
The series received a number of awards, including:

- 1989 Houston International Film Festival "Worldfest Houston" – Silver Award for the episode "Politics, Privacy, and the Press"
- 1989 International Association of Audio Visual Communicators – Special Achievement award to "Cindy" in Talent
- 1989 International Film and TV Festival of New York – Finalist Award for the episodes "To Defend a Killer" and "Under Orders, Under Fire Part I"
- 1989 National Educational Film and Video Festival – Bronze Apple Award for the episode "To Defend a Killer"
- 1990 Ohio State Award for the episode "Under Orders, Under Fire"
