= Arnold, Pennsylvania =

City in Pennsylvania, US

- City
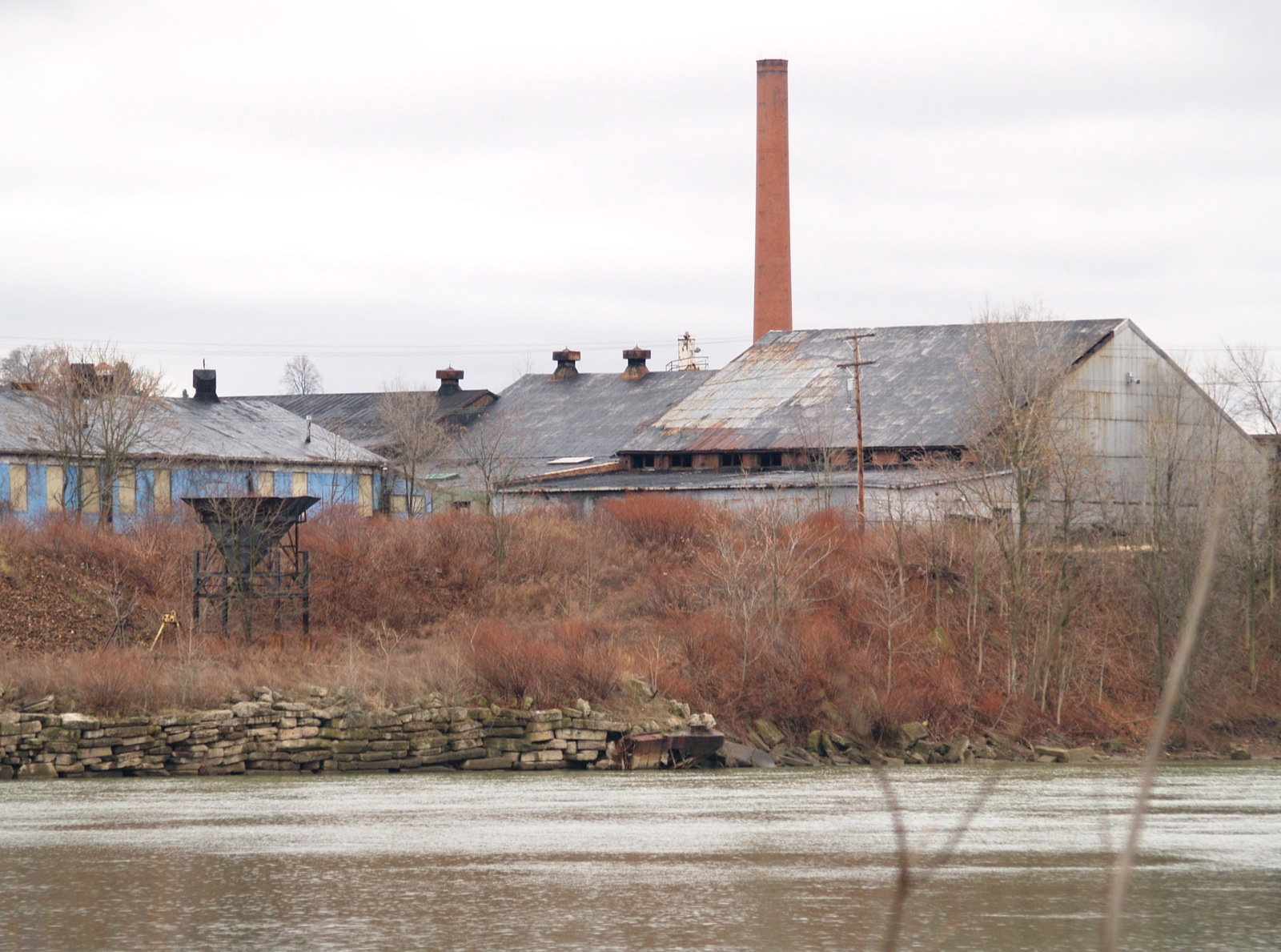
- Abandoned factory along the Allegheny River

- Seal
- Motto: Proud City of Proud People
- Location of Arnold in Westmoreland County, Pennsylvania.
- Coordinates: 40°34′39″N 79°45′52″W
- Country: United States
- State: Pennsylvania
- County: Westmoreland
- Settled: 1781
- Incorporated (borough): 1896
- Incorporated (city): 1939

Government
  - Mayor: Shannon Santucci (D)

Area
  - Total: 0.85 sq mi (2.21 km^{2})
  - Land: 0.73 sq mi (1.90 km^{2})
  - Water: 0.12 sq mi (0.31 km^{2})

Population (2020)
  - Total: 4,772
  - Density: 6,518.8/sq mi (2,516.92/km^{2})
- Time zone: UTC-5 (Eastern (EST))
  - Summer (DST): UTC-4 (EDT)
- FIPS code: 42-03088
- Website: cityofarnoldpa.org

Arnold is a city in Westmoreland County, Pennsylvania, United States. It is part of the Greater Pittsburgh metropolitan area. The population was 4,772 at the 2020 census.

== History ==
Present-day Westmoreland County was part of the hunting reserves of the Iroquois Haudenosaunee. European colonists began to penetrate the area in the 1750s, and circa 1781 Robert McCrea purchased the land on which Arnold is situated. William Jack acquired the property and later passed it on to Wilson Jack. The area around Arnold was first settled in 1852 by Major Andrew Arnold, who grew up in nearby Kittanning.

With the creation of Westmoreland County in 1773, the area that became Arnold was originally part of Burrell, and later Lower Burrell, townships. Arnold was then part of the newly created city of New Kensington from 1891 until it was separately incorporated as a borough in January 1896, and as a third-class city in 1939. Arnold is governed under Pennsylvania's third-class city code, with a mayor, treasurer, controller, and four council members elected at-large. Past mayors of Arnold have been M. Frank Horne (1939-1960), Alfred Colaianni (1960-1963), Willie DeMao (1963-2004), John Campbell (2004–2012), and Larry Milito (2012-2016).

Karen Peconi-Biriccochi, a Democrat, took office in 2016. In 2018, during protests over the shooting of an unarmed African American teen by a white police officer in East Pittsburgh, Peconi authored a social media post that urged law enforcement to "bring the hoses" against the protesters. Calls for her resignation resulted in city council formally requesting the state legislature to remove her from office. On May 21, 2019 Peconi-Biriccochi was defeated by Councilman Joseph Bia II in the Democratic primary, effectively ending her bid for re-election in the heavily Democratic city. Bia was subsequently elected to a full term as mayor in November 2019 and took office in 2020. Bia was defeated in the 2023 primary by former police chief Shannon Santucci, who took office in 2024.

== Geography ==
Arnold is located on the eastern shore of the Allegheny River, northeast of Pittsburgh. According to the U.S. Census Bureau, the city has a total area of 0.8 square miles (2.1 km^{2}), of which 0.7 square miles (1.8 km^{2}) is land and 0.1 square miles (0.26 km^{2}) (6.41%) is water.

=== Surrounding and adjacent neighborhoods ===
Arnold's only land border is with New Kensington to the north, east and south. Across the Allegheny River, Arnold runs adjacent with East Deer Township in Allegheny County

== Demographics ==
Historical population
Census	Pop.	Note	%±
1900	1,428		—
1910	1,818		27.3%
1920	6,120		236.6%
1930	10,575		72.8%
1940	10,898		3.1%
1950	10,263		−5.8%
1960	9,437		−8.0%
1970	8,174		−13.4%
1980	6,853		−16.2%
1990	6,113		−10.8%
2000	5,667		−7.3%
2010	5,157		−9.0%
2020	4,772		−7.5%

=== 2020 census ===
As of the 2020 census, Arnold had a population of 4,772. The median age was 39.8 years. 24.1% of residents were under the age of 18 and 16.1% of residents were 65 years of age or older. For every 100 females there were 92.9 males, and for every 100 females age 18 and over there were 88.0 males age 18 and over.

100.0% of residents lived in urban areas, while 0.0% lived in rural areas.

There were 2,165 households in Arnold, of which 26.7% had children under the age of 18 living in them. Of all households, 26.2% were married-couple households, 25.1% were households with a male householder and no spouse or partner present, and 39.4% were households with a female householder and no spouse or partner present. About 39.8% of all households were made up of individuals and 13.9% had someone living alone who was 65 years of age or older.

There were 2,647 housing units, of which 18.2% were vacant. The homeowner vacancy rate was 4.3% and the rental vacancy rate was 9.3%.

Racial composition as of the 2020 census
Race	Number	Percent
White	3,111	65.2%
Black or African American	1,110	23.3%
American Indian and Alaska Native	14	0.3%
Asian	24	0.5%
Native Hawaiian and Other Pacific Islander	5	0.1%
Some other race	66	1.4%
Two or more races	442	9.3%
Hispanic or Latino (of any race)	94	2.0%

=== 2000 census ===
As of the 2000 census, there were 5,667 people, 2,589 households, and 1,439 families residing in the city. The population density was 7,706.6 inhabitants per square mile (2,975.5/km^{2}). There were 2,976 housing units at an average density of 4,047.1 per square mile (1,562.6/km^{2}). The racial makeup of the city was 84.84% White, 12.76% African American, 0.18% Native American, 0.14% Asian, 0.02% Pacific Islander, 0.26% from other races, and 1.80% from two or more races. Hispanic or Latino of any race were 1.13% of the population.

There were 2,589 households, of which 23.6% had children under the age of 18 living with them, 37.5% were married couples living together, 14.4% had a female householder with no husband present, and 44.4% were non-families. 39.9% of all households were made up of individuals, and 20.7% had someone living alone who was 65 years of age or older. The average household size was 2.15 and the average family size was 2.90.

In the city, the population was spread out, with 21.6% under the age of 18, 6.9% from 18 to 24, 28.7% from 25 to 44, 20.2% from 45 to 64, and 22.6% who were 65 years of age or older. The median age was 40 years. For every 100 females, there were 86.5 males. For every 100 females age 18 and over, there were 82.9 males.

The median income for a household in the city was $26,190, and the median income for a family was $32,569. Males had a median income of $31,164 versus $23,953 for females. The per capita income for the city was $16,631. About 14.0% of families and 17.7% of the population were below the poverty line, including 30.8% of those under age 18 and 10.3% of those age 65 or over.

== Landmarks ==
Notable landmarks in Arnold have included:

- Arnold Station, a railroad stop established in 1867, so named because the land on which it was built was given by the Arnold Family.
- The Chambers Glass Company, which opened in 1891, was at the time one of the best equipped and most efficient glass factories in the country.
- George Moore Home, a 17-room mansion, demolished in the 1960s.
- The Morris Davis home, one of the first local private dwellings with electricity. Davis built it very precisely, rejecting lumber if it had knotholes or any defects.
- Eiler Hall, located in what is now a parking lot for municipal employees, was a fashionable site for parties, dances, banquets and public shows.
- The Edna Hotel, named after George Moore's daughter, was built in the 1890s and served as a meeting place for all of Arnold at the turn of the 20th century. The building was destroyed by a massive fire in the late 1990s
- The John Fedan Store began as a rental for other merchants and grew into a hardware store and later a furniture and appliance store.
- The Arnold Drug Store opened in 1898 and was also the post office location at the time.

== Education ==
Arnold is served by the New Kensington–Arnold School District, which includes four schools in New Kensington and Arnold: Valley Junior/Senior High School, three elementary schools. Roy A. Hunt Elementary (Arnold), H.D. Berkey School (Arnold), and Martin Elementary School (New Kensington).

The current Roy A. Hunt Elementary once served as Arnold's high school prior to the merger of the two districts. After the merge was completed it was used as Valley Middle School until the restructuring of the school district at the end of 2012, and now stands as an elementary school holding grades 3-6

== Notable people ==
- Clara Chiano (1921–2000), American Girls Professional Baseball League player
- Johnny Costa (1922–1996), jazz pianist
- Fannie Sellins (1872–1919), labor activist
