= Burrell School District =

School district in Pennsylvania

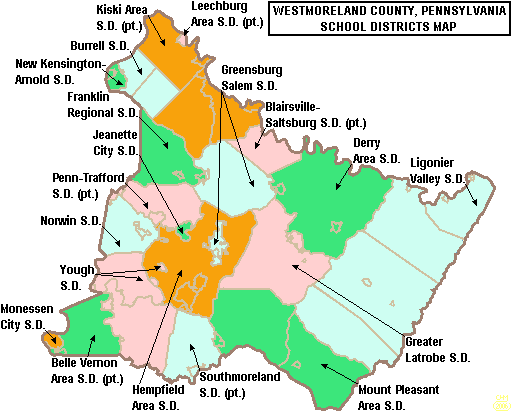

Address
- 1021 Puckety Church Road Lower Burrell, Westmoreland County, Pennsylvania, 15068; United States

District information
- Type: Public

Students and staff
- District mascot: Buccaneer
- Colors: Blue and white

Other information
- Website: www.burrell.k12.pa.us

The Burrell School District is a small, suburban public school district located in northern Westmoreland County, Pennsylvania, United States. The district is 18 miles (29 km) northeast of Pittsburgh. The Burrell School District serves the City of Lower Burrell and Upper Burrell Township. The District covers 27 square miles (70 km^{2}). According to 2000 federal census data, Burrell School District serves a resident population of 14,848 people. By 2010, the District's population declined to 14,081 people. The educational attainment levels for the Burrell School District population (25 years old and over) were 93.1% high school graduates and 23% college graduates. The district is one of the 500 public school districts of Pennsylvania.

According to the Pennsylvania Budget and Policy Center, 28.7% of the District's pupils lived at 185% or below the Federal Poverty Level as shown by their eligibility for the federal free or reduced price school meal programs in 2012. In 2009, the district residents' per capita income was $19,871, while the median family income was $49,425. In the Commonwealth, the median family income was $49,501 and the United States median family income was $49,445, in 2010. In Westmoreland County, the median household income was $50,736. By 2013, the median household income in the United States rose to $52,100. In 2014, the median household income in the USA was $53,700.

Burrell School District operates Burrell High School (9th-12th), Charles A. Huston Middle School (6th-8th), Stewart School (4th-5th) and Bon Air School (K-3rd). High school students may choose to attend the Northern Westmoreland Career and Technology Center for training in the construction and mechanical trades, automotive trades, Culinary Arts, computer technology, welding and health related occupations. The district is part of the Westmoreland Intermediate Unit IU7 which provides special education services to the district. The administrative complex of Burrell High School contains both levels of district-wide administration. Superintendent - Dr. Shannon Wagner.
