= Burrell (given name) =

Burrell is a masculine given name which may refer to:

- B. Clark Burchfiel (1934–2024), American geologist
- Burrell Driver (c. 1820–1877), English first-class cricketer
- Burrell Ellis (born 1957), American attorney and politician
- Burrell Ives Humphreys (born 1927), American former New Jersey Superior Court judge and county prosecutor
- Burrell Shields (1929–1997), American National Football League player
- Burrell Smith (born 1955), American circuit designer
