= Willie Thrower =

American football player (1930–2002)

No. 14
- Position: Quarterback

Personal information
- Born: March 22, 1930; New Kensington, Pennsylvania, U.S.
- Died: February 20, 2002 (aged 71); New Kensington, Pennsylvania, U.S.
- Listed height: 5 ft 11 in (1.80 m)
- Listed weight: 182 lb (83 kg)

Career information
- High school: New Kensington
- College: Michigan State (1949–1952)
- NFL draft: 1953: undrafted

Career history
- Chicago Bears (1953); Toronto Balmy Beach Beachers (1954)

Awards and highlights
- National champion (1952)

Career NFL statistics
- Passing attempts: 8
- Passing completions: 3
- Completion percentage: 37.5%
- TD–INT: 0–1
- Passing yards: 27
- Passer rating: 15
- Stats at Pro Football Reference

Willie Lee Thrower Sr. (March 22, 1930 – February 20, 2002) was an American professional football player who was a quarterback for the Chicago Bears of the National Football League (NFL). Born near Pittsburgh in New Kensington, Pennsylvania, Thrower was known as "Mitts" because of his large hands and arm strength, which stood in contrast to his 5' 11" frame. He was known to throw a football 70 yards. Thrower played college football for the Michigan State Spartans, who won a national championship in 1952. He became the first NFL African American quarterback in the modern era, playing for the Bears in 1953.

== Early life ==
Thrower played halfback in the single-wing formation for New Kensington High School (present-name: Valley High School) as a freshman just after the end of World War II, in 1945. Single wing halfbacks received a direct center snap, and then had run, handoff or pass options. The team lost two games in 1945. In subsequent seasons head coach Don Fletcher installed the T formation and moved Thrower to quarterback.

From his sophomore to senior years, New Kensington won 24 straight games, including the 1946 and 1947 Western Pennsylvania Interscholastic Athletic League (WPIAL) Class AA championships. As a dual-threat quarterback, Thrower was also an All-WPIAL and all-state first team honors and was named captain for an All-American scholastic selection covering the nation east of the Mississippi River. His final high school record was 35–3–1.

Thrower faced racism. In 1947, the Peanut Bowl, played at A. J. McClung Memorial Stadium, the home of the University of Georgia's football team, featuring a top high school team from the East against a top team from the South, rescinded the invitation it had extended to New Kensington High School to play in the annual January 1 prep classic game when organizers saw a photograph of its star player, Thrower. In addition, many colleges opted not to extend Thrower a scholarship when they discovered his ethnicity.

=== College football ===
After graduating, Thrower chose to play collegiate football for the Michigan State Spartans alongside some of his high school teammates William Horrell, Joseph Klein, Renaldo Kozikowski, Vincent Pisano and the Tamburo brothers, Harry and Richard. He would remain in East Lansing from 1949 to 1952, competing for playing time at quarterback with All-Americans Al Dorow and Tom Yewcic. Under head coach Biggie Munn, Thrower became the first black quarterback to play in the Big Ten Conference, in 1950, his first year of varsity eligibility (NCAA rules dictated no freshmen on varsity teams, thereby preventing Thrower, who was a freshman in 1949, fron playing) although during the first two years of his varsity career, he only attempted 14 passes.

During the 1952 championship season, Thrower was an integral part of the title run, completing 59 percent of his passes (29-of-43) for 400 yards and five touchdowns. In a crucial game with Notre Dame, Thrower stepped in for an injured quarterback Tom Yewcic and threw a touchdown in a 21–3 win. In his final game in a Spartan uniform, Thrower completed seven of his 11 attempts for 71 yards and a touchdown, and added a rushing touchdown in a dominating 62–13 win over Marquette that sealed the nation's Number 1 ranking and a championship for Michigan State.

== Professional career ==
In the 10th minute of the period, (Joe) Perry fumbled and (Dick) Hensley recovered on the 49ers' 16. Willie Thrower, former Michigan State Negro quarterback star making his major league debut, passed 12 to (Jim) Dooley, putting the ball on the 4. (George) Blanda and (Fred) Morrison came into the game with a resounding razzberry. They wanted Willie to put it over. But Morrison did it on a blast off tackle. The boos changed to cheers.

— October 19, 1953 excerpt of Thrower's first NFL game by Chicago Tribune sportswriter George Strickland.

Although Thrower was not drafted in 1953, he was offered a one-year, $8,500 contract with the Chicago Bears. He became the backup quarterback and roommate to future Pro Football Hall of Famer George Blanda.

He did not play until October 18, 1953, against the San Francisco 49ers. Bears coach George Halas was unhappy with Blanda's play and pulled him, sending in Thrower. He moved the team to the 15-yard line of the 49ers, but was denied a chance to score a TD when Halas put Blanda back into the game. The Bears eventually lost the game 35–28. Thrower completed 3 out of 8 passes for 27 yards, and had one interception. He would only play one more game for the Bears, who released Thrower after the 1953 season.

In 1954, Thrower signed with the Winnipeg Blue Bombers in Canada but was released before the start of the season. He then signed with the Toronto Balmy Beach Beachers but a shoulder injury ended his career.

== Military service ==
Thrower was commissioned a second lieutenant in the United States Army and served during the Korean War.

== Subsequent life and death ==
Thrower returned to New Kensington from Canada and married a childhood neighbor. They then moved to Yonkers, NY where he worked as a social worker, but returned to New Kensington, where they raised three sons. In New Kensington, he worked in construction and as an entrepreneur, operating The Touchdown Lounge.

Thrower died of a heart attack in New Kensington on February 20, 2002, at the age of 71. His funeral was held at the Mount Calvary Missionary Baptist Church in New Kensington, where 150 people mourned.

== Legacy ==
In 1979, Thrower was elected to the Westmoreland County Sports Hall of Fame. In 1981, he was inducted into AK Valley Hall of Fame. In 2011, he was inducted into the WPIAL Hall of Fame.

Being the first African-American quarterback in the NFL, in 2002 Thrower told The Valley News Dispatch of Tarentum, Pa, "I look at it like this: I was like the Jackie Robinson of football. A black quarterback was unheard of before I hit the pros."

In 2006, a statue of Thrower was erected near Valley High School in New Kensington to honor his accomplishments. The statue was unveiled during a Valley High School football game in September attended by Pittsburgh Steelers owner Dan Rooney as well as Thrower's family. Willie Thrower was also mentioned by former NFL quarterback Warren Moon in his Pro Football Hall of Fame acceptance speech. Moon thanked Thrower, among others, for giving him inspiration during a time when few African-Americans played the quarterback position in the NFL.

In 2003, the Willie Thrower Historical Marker was erected on the road that runs past the high school Thrower attended in New Kensington.

In 2021, the Willie Thrower Award Foundation debuted an award for the top quarterback in the WPIAL and City League by honoring a top quarterback from the 2020 season. The award is a replica of the statue of Thrower.

October 12, 2023 has been designated Willie Thrower Community Day in New Kensignton, as part of a four-day celebration of the 70th anniversary of Thrower's play for the Chicago Bears.

== See also ==
- Racial issues faced by black quarterbacks
