= Northern Westmoreland Career and Technology Center =

Coordinates: 40.56865°N 79.75501°W

Location
- 705 Stevenson Blvd. New Kensington, Pennsylvania 15068; United States

Information
- School type: Public, Vocational-Educational
- Administrator: Kurt Kiefer
- Staff: 8
- Faculty: 13.0
- Grades: 10–12
- Website: Official website

Northern Westmoreland Career and Technology Center is a part-time vocational–technical school in the northern section of Westmoreland County in the U.S. state of Pennsylvania. It is the smallest of three vocational–technical schools in the county.

== Sending school districts ==
There are four sending school districts, which each have their own high school.

School district	School name
Burrell	Burrell High School
Franklin Regional	Franklin Regional High School
Kiski Area	Kiski Area High School
New Kensington–Arnold	Valley High School

== Programs ==
There are several programs at the school for the students.

- Auto Body Collision Repair and Refinishing
- Auto Mechanics
- Carpentry
- Commercial Art
- Computer Technology
- Cosmetology
- Culinary Arts
- Electronics
- Heating, Ventilation, and Air Conditioning (HVAC)
- Machine Tool
- Marketing
- Masonry
- Medical
- Welding
