= Clara Chiano =

American baseball player

- Infielder
- Born: September 19, 1921; Arnold, Pennsylvania, U.S.
- Died: November 27, 2000 (aged 79); Orange City, Florida, U.S.
- Batted: Right Threw: Right

Teams
- Racine Belles (1944)

Career highlights and awards
- Women in Baseball – AAGPBL Permanent Display at Baseball Hall of Fame and Museum (since 1988)

Clara Chiano (September 19, 1921 – November 27, 2000) was an American infielder who played in the All-American Girls Professional Baseball League (AAGPBL). Listed at 5' 0", 108 lb., Chiano batted and threw right handed. She was born in Arnold, Pennsylvania.

The diminutive Clara Chiano played semiprofessional softball in Racine, Wisconsin and Boston in the early 1940s. She joined the league with the Racine Belles club in its 1944 season.

After baseball, Chiano worked as an associate for the electronics industry in Dorchester, Massachusetts. She retired in 1983 and moved to Orange City in Florida.

The AAGPBL folded in 1954, but there is a permanent display at the Baseball Hall of Fame and Museum at Cooperstown, New York, since November 5, 1988, that honors the entire league rather than any individual figure.

Chiano was a long time resident of Orange City, Florida, where she died in 2000 at the age of 79.
