= Charles Burrell (disambiguation) =

Charles Burrell & Sons were builders of traction engines.

Charles Burrell may also refer to:

- Sir Charles Burrell, 3rd Baronet (1774–1862)
- Sir Charles Burrell, 10th Baronet (born 1962)
- Charles Burrell (musician) (1920–2025), American classical and jazz bass player

== See also ==
- Burrell (disambiguation)
