= John Burrell =

John Burrell may refer to:

- John Burrell (poet), Scottish poet and goldsmith
- John Burrell (wide receiver) (1940–2024), American football wide receiver
- John Burrell (American football coach) (born c. 1969), American college football coach
- John Burrell (entomologist) (1762–1825), English entomologist
- John Burrell (theatre director) (1910–1972), English theatre director
- John Burrell (cricketer) (1870–1948), English cricketer
