= Burrell High School =

High school in Pennsylvania, United States

Coordinates: 40.584707°N 79.697248°W

Burrell High School is a public high school located at 1021 Puckety Church Road, Lower Burrell, Pennsylvania. Part of the Burrell School District, the building houses grades 9 through 12. According to the National Center for Education Statistics, in 2010, the school reported an enrollment of 627 pupils. Burrell High School employed 39 teachers, yielding a student–teacher ratio of 16:1.

== Extracurricular activities ==
The district offers a wide variety of clubs, activities and sports.

=== Sports ===
The district provides:

- Football: Varsity, Junior Varsity, Middle School
- Boys Basketball: Varsity, 9th grade, Middle School
- Girls Basketball: Varsity, Middle School
- Boys Soccer
- Girls Soccer
- Boys Hockey: Varsity
- Girls tennis varsity
- Boys tennis varsity
- Varsity Wrestling and Jr. High Wrestling
- Swimming Varsity
- Girls Volleyball
- Golf
- Track & Field
- Boys Cross Country
- Girls Cross Country

== Notable alumni ==
- Jason Altmire, United States congressman
- Joy Suprano, actress
