= Tom Burrell =

Founder of one of the first African American ad agencies

Thomas J. "Tom" Burrell (born March 18, 1939) founder and chairman emeritus of Burrell Communications, became one of the first African Americans in the field of advertising.

== Early years ==
Burrell was born in Chicago, where his father owned a tavern and his mother worked for a beauty parlor. He switched high schools to avoid being near "the wrong crowd" and it was in the second one that a teacher encouraged him to look into the field of advertising. He then went to Roosevelt University, majoring in English and with a minor in advertising.

== Career ==
Burrell was "the first black person to work in a Chicago advertising agency." After ten years of advancing, he and Emmett McBain opened their own agency, Burrell McBain Advertising. Part of Burrell's pitch was that "black people are not dark-skinned white people," referring to differences in music preferences and other cultural differences. Burrell bought out his partner in 1974 and renamed the agency Burrell Communications Group. McDonald's and Coca-Cola were early clients.

In 1999 he sold 49% of his firm to fund expansion, and subsequently stepped aside, becoming chairman emeritus of the agency; Burrell was later inducted into the American Advertising Federation Hall of Fame. He also authored two books, Brainwashed: Challenging the Myth of Black Inferiority and Brainwashed: Erasing the Myth of Black Inferiority.

One post-retirement recognition of his professional accomplishments came in 2017 from The One Club.

== Personal ==
He and his wife Madeleine Moore Burrell live in Miami. Burrell has donated to and benefitted from Chicago Lighthouse for the Blind since being diagnosed with macular degeneration.
