= Rachel Lyon =

American film director and producer

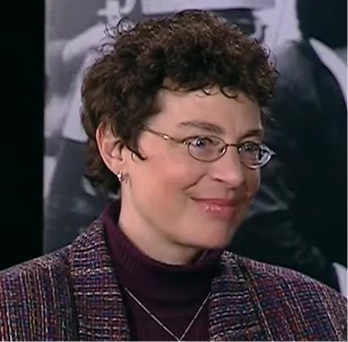
- Lyon on CUNY TV's City Cinematheque, 2006
- Born: Rachel Valerie Lyon
- Occupations: Producer, director
- Years active: 1980–present
- Website: www.lionessmedia.com

Rachel V. Lyon is an American film director and producer.

== Career ==
Lyon has produced more than 65 feature films, movies-for-television, feature documentaries, and limited series for PBS, NBC, CNN, National Geographic, and the History Channel. In 1980, she produced Tell Me A Riddle, which was directed by Academy Award-winner Lee Grant. Her 1985 FRONTLINE television documentary, Men Who Molest, received an Emmy for Outstanding Background/Analysis of a Single Current Story. Lyon's 2014 film Hate Crimes in the Heartland received the Paul Robeson Award for Best Feature Documentary at the Newark Black Film Festival.

Lyon is the CEO of Lioness Media Arts, Inc.

== Scholarship ==
Lyon has held faculty positions at Bentley University, Queens College, Southern Methodist University, and Northern Kentucky University. She is the author of "Media, Race, Crime, and the Punishment: Re-Framing Stereotypes in Crime and Human Rights Issues," which was published in the DePaul Law Review in 2009. In 2012, Lyon co-authored the paper "Digital Divisions: Racial (In)Justice and Limits of Social Informatics in The State of Georgia vs. Troy Anthony Davis," which was presented at the Northern Kentucky Law Review Symposium, and published in the Northern Kentucky Law Review.

== Fundraising ==
In October 2013, Lyon joined the Jewish Federation of Cincinnati as Director of Special Gifts.

== Selected filmography ==
Year	Title	Position
2014	Hate Crimes in the Heartland	Writer/Director/Producer
2010	Etruscan Odyssey: Expanding Archaeology	Director/Producer
2008	Juror Number Six	Director/Producer
2007	Race to Execution	Director/Producer
2001	Mr. Dreyfuss Goes to Washington	Director/Producer
1995	Shadow Over Tibet: Stories in Exile	Director/Producer
1991	Thousand Pieces of Gold	Associate Producer
1985	Men Who Molest: Children Who Survive	Producer
1980	Tell Me A Riddle	Producer
