= Burrell Driver =

English cricketer

Burrell Neale Driver (c. 1820 – 25 May 1877) was an English first-class cricketer active 1847–53 who played for Surrey. He was born in Southwark and died in Homerton. He appeared in six first-class matches.
