= Prudence Burns Burrell =

American nurse and author

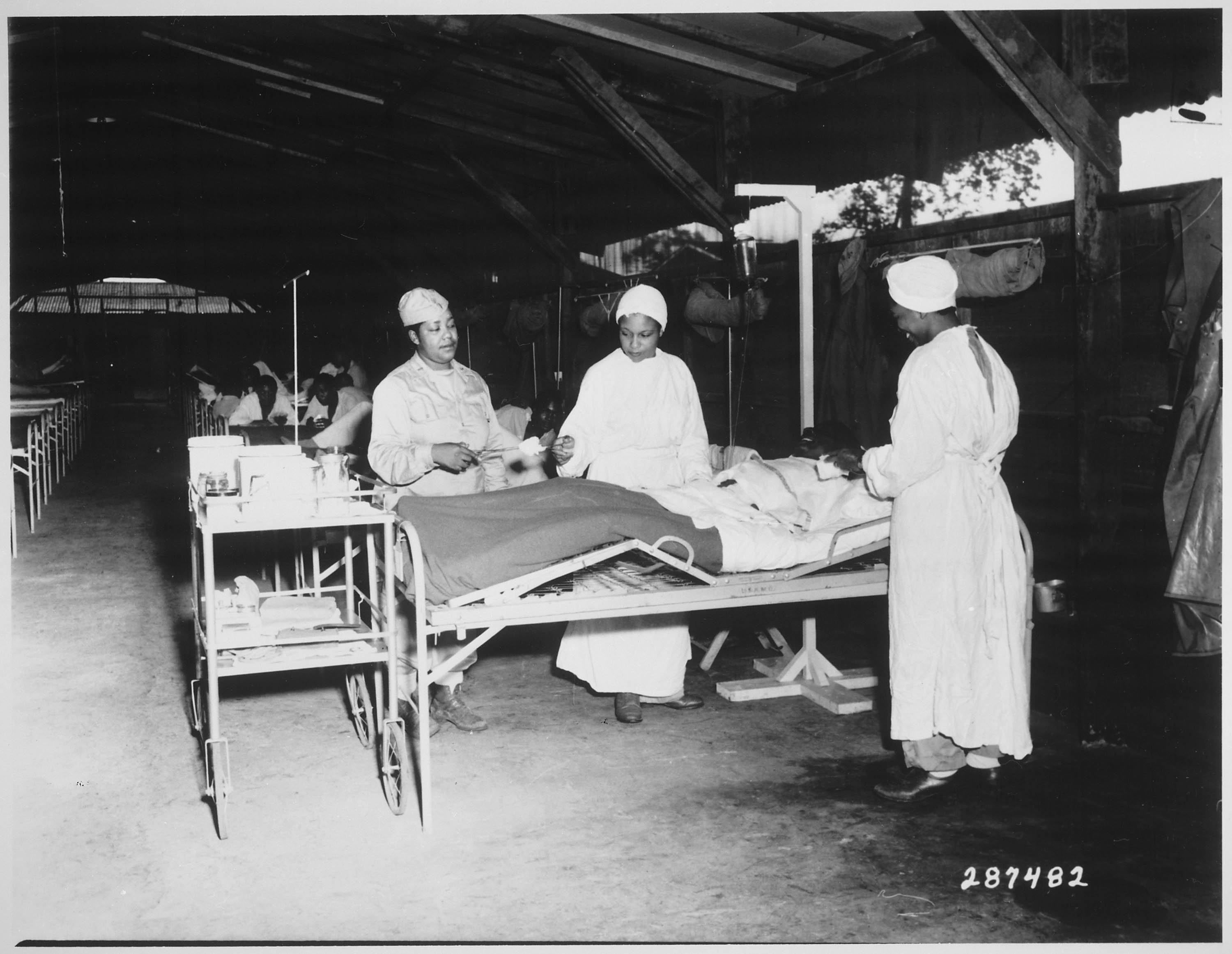
Surgical ward treatment at the 268th Station Hospital in 1944 with Prudence Burns on the left, standing next to Elcena Towncent and an unidentified nurse.

Prudence Hathaway Burrell (née Burns; March 23, 1916 – February 29, 2012) was an African American nurse and author. During World War II, she served in the Army Nurse Corps in segregated hospitals, mainly in the Pacific theater. Her autobiography Hathaway, was published in 1997. Burrell continued to tell the story of African American nurses in the war throughout her life.

== Early life and education ==
Prudence Hathaway Burns was born in Mounds, Illinois on March 23, 1916. She grew up with a caretaker in Danville, Illinois. In 1934, she graduated from Lovejoy High School, where she excelled in Latin. After high school, she moved to St. Louis, where she worked as a maid to put herself through nursing school. Burrell trained at the nursing school at a segregated hospital in Kansas City, General Hospital No. 2, and was certified as a registered nurse in 1939. In 1941, she was starting her degree in public health at the University of Minnesota, which she completed after the war.

== Career ==
In 1941, First Lady Eleanor Roosevelt, Dr. Mary McLeod Bethune, and Mable Staupers, president of the Negro Graduate Nurses Association, urged the Army Surgeon General to recruit black nurses. After the attack on Pearl Harbor, the Army's quota of only 48 black nurses was lifted, and recruitment of African American nurses began nationwide. Burrell was asked by the Kansas City, Missouri, chapter of the American Red Cross to recruit nurses, but ended up joining the Army Nurse Corps herself on October 20, 1942, with the rank of second lieutenant. She eventually attained the rank of first lieutenant, but was technically not allowed to treat white troops.

Burrell attended basic training at Fort Huachuca. She was part of the 268th Station Hospital for three years. On October 15, 1943, she and her unit were stationed in Australia for six months before they were transferred to a hospital in Milne Bay, New Guinea. In May 1945, the hospital unit was transferred to the Philippines. As the war was ending, Burrell married Lieutenant Lowell Burrell, a Detroit native. Her wedding dress was made of a silk parachute. After the war, Burrell continued to study at the University of Minnesota and graduated in 1951 with a bachelor's degree. She and her husband moved to Detroit and Burrell worked as a math teacher.

== Memoir and legacy ==
Burrell kept track of the women she served with and continued to speak about her experiences in the Army. Burrell wrote her memoir Hathaway, which was published in 1997. As of 2001, she had a list of about 80 nurses she had traced. Burrell died on February 29, 2012.

== Awards ==
She received a presidential award honoring outstanding African Americans who served with distinction during World War II from President Bill Clinton during the 24th Annual Congressional Black Caucus legislative weekend.
