= Burrell Normal School =

School in Alabama, U.S. (1903–1960)

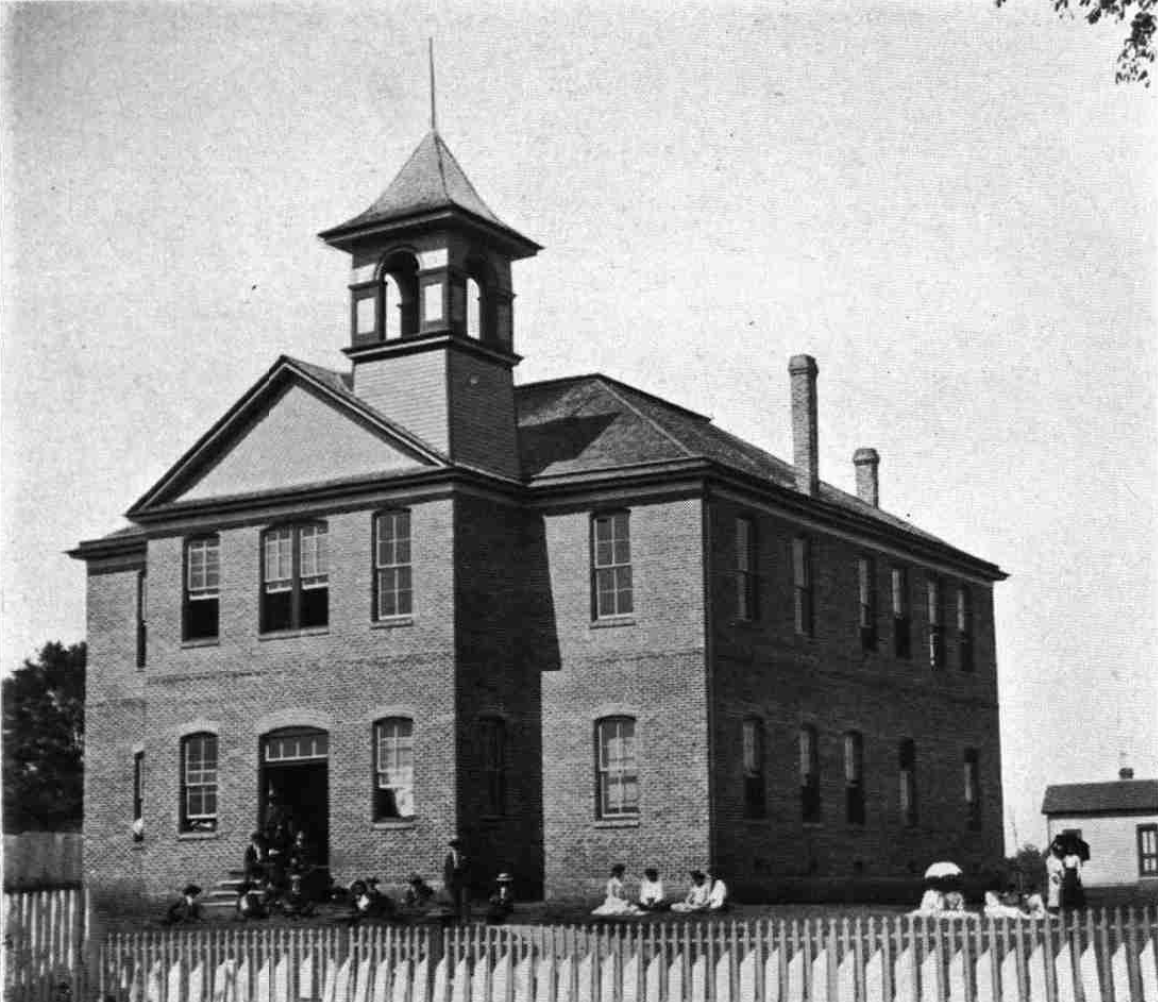
- Burrell Normal School (c. 1908)

Location
- Florence, Lauderdale County, Alabama, U.S. 34.796194°N 87.682832°W

Information
- Other name: Burrell Academy, Burrell High School, Burrell–Slater High School
- School type: Private Christian grammar school, high school, and normal school
- Established: 1903
- Closed: 1969
- Affiliation: American Missionary Association

Burrell Normal School (1903–1969), was a private school for African American students established in 1903 in Florence, Alabama. The school was for grades 1 to 12, and served as a normal school. A historical marker for the school was erected by the Florence Historical Board and is located at W College Street at Burrell Street in Florence. It was also known as Burrell Academy, Burrell High School, and Burrell–Slater High School.

== History ==
The school was first named Burrell Academy and was initially located in Selma, Alabama. It was founded in 1869 as the first school for Blacks in the city of Selma, and was destroyed by a suspicious fire in 1900.

In 1903, the school was rebuilt by the American Missionary Association (A.M.A), which had decided to change the location of the building based on need to Florence, Alabama. The first class to attend the new school was in 1904, and the first graduating class was in 1906. In 1905, they had four teachers, including the principal.

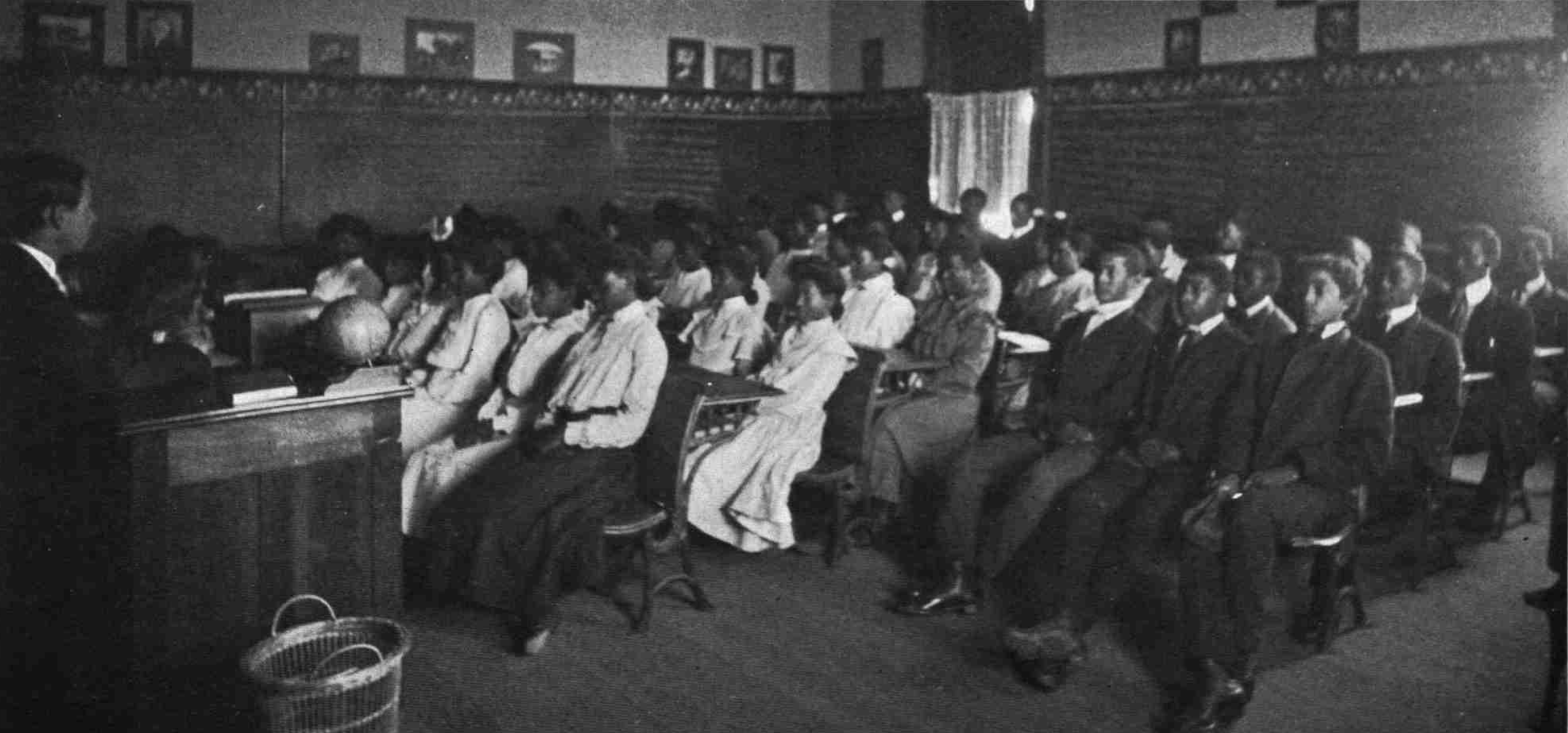
Upper grades (c. 1910) at Burrell Normal School

Benjamin F. Cox was the first principal, serving from 1905 to 1906. In 1906, Cox was transferred to an Albany Normal School in Albany, Georgia; and George N. White was promoted to the role of principal.

In 1937, the Florence City Board of Education assumed its operation of the school and changed the name to Burrell High School. In 1951, the school was moved to the Slater Elementary School Building, and the name was changed to Burrell–Slater High School. The Burrell–Slater building burned in 1958, and a new Burrell-Slater building was constructed on the original site by 1960. In 1969, after racial integration, it became the first vocational school in the city.

The 1908–1909 catalog for the Burrell Normal School can be found at the Alabama Department of Archives and History.
