= Isaac D. Burrell =

American physician

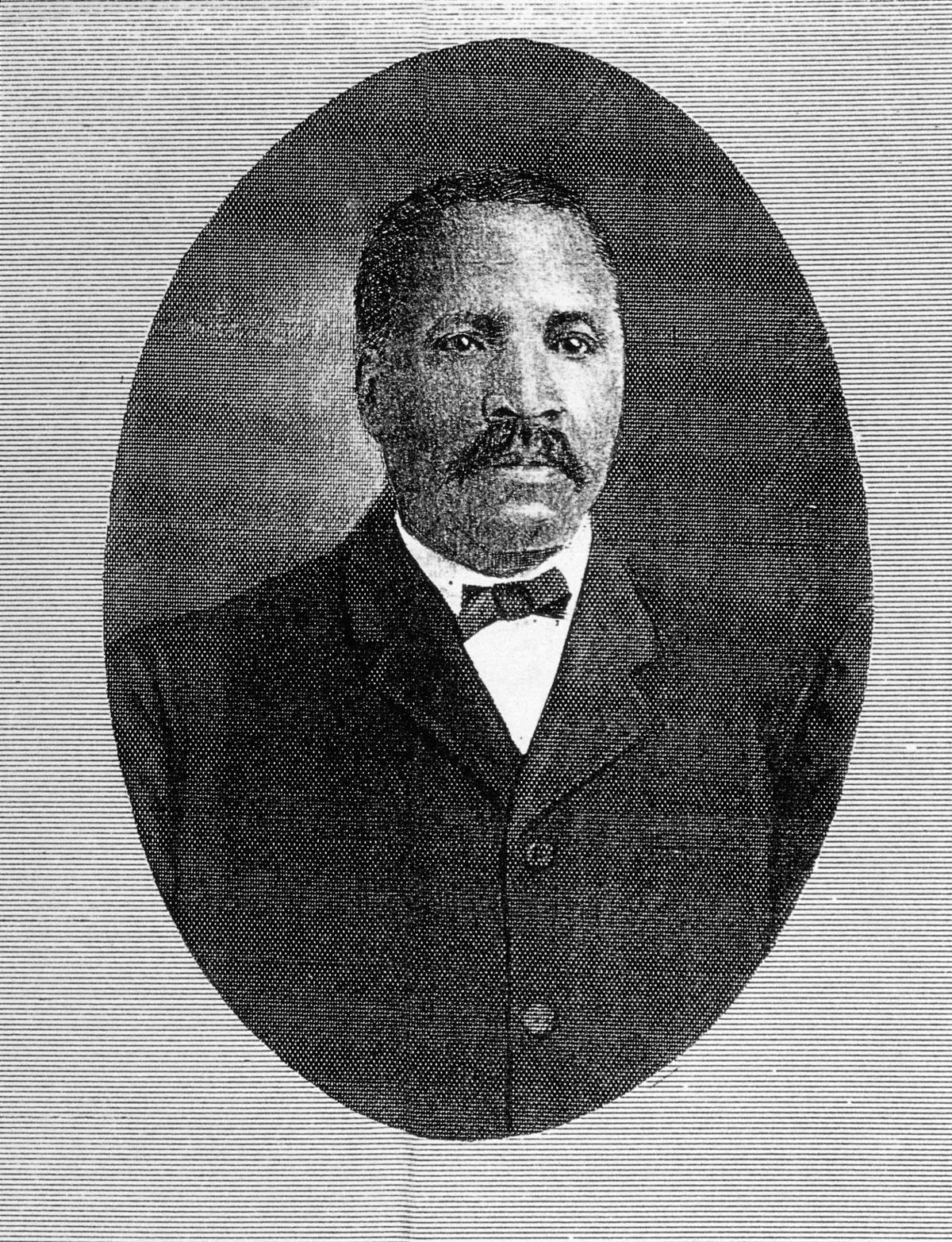
Portrait of Isaac D. Burrell

Isaac David Burell (March 10, 1865 – March 21, 1914) was a physician and pharmacist in Roanoke, Virginia. He was African-American.

== Personal life ==
Isaac David Burell was born on March 10, 1865, at his father's farm in Chula, Virginia, in Amelia County, Virginia. Probably he was the son of a former slave, Isaac David Burrell first attended Lincoln University (Pennsylvania) and later received an M.D. in 1893 from the Leonard Medical College of Shaw University in Raleigh, North Carolina. He moved to Roanoke and there established in 1893 a prospering medical practice as one of the few doctors for Black patients.

Burrell opened a drugstore, for many years the only Black-owned drugstore in southwestern Virginia. He started a pharmacy on Gainsborough Road between Patton and Harrison Avenues that eventually became the largest Black-owned pharmacy in southwest Virginia.

His wife, Margaret Barnette Burrell (1873–1970) from Lynchburg, Virginia, was also recognized as a society leader in Roanoke. She was a graduate of Hampton Normal & Industrial Institute, and became a teacher in Roanoke's Third Ward School. They lived on Gainsborough Road before building a mansion around the corner on in the first block of Patton Avenue NW. "His wife was accomplished and sociable. She is a lady of rare traits and accomplishments."

A still photograph of Burrell and his wife is held by the New York Public Library.

== Death ==
Because Black patients were denied admission to the city's white hospitals, he made the 220-mile journey by train to Freedman's Hospital in Washington, D.C., where he died shortly after undergoing surgery for gallstones. He died on March 21, 1914, in Washington, D.C.

== Legacy ==
His death was the impetus for several Black physicians of Roanoke to open a hospital for their patients. "The hospital’s namesake, Dr. Isaac Burrell, had perished on account of having to travel to Washington, D.C. — by boxcar, no less — to receive routine gall bladder surgery denied to him at segregated Roanoke Hospital, the predecessor to Roanoke Memorial." Named Burrell Memorial Hospital, the ten-bed facility was on Henry Street. The flu epidemic of 1919 created the need for expanded facilities, so the hospital moved into the abandoned Allegheny Institute building on the corner of McDowell Avenue and Park Street (now 7th Street) in 1921. This building was used until 1955 when the present hospital was opened. In 1919 the city leased the abandoned buildings of the Allegheny Institute to the doctors who ran the Black hospital there from 1921 until 1955, when a modern brick hospital was constructed with the help of a woman's auxiliary. The civil rights movement in the 1960s opened white hospitals to Black patients, and Burrell Memorial Hospital closed in 1978. The hospital also was established without support from the whites, and had the first African-American School of Nursing to be accredited in Virginia.The building, now called The Burrell Center, houses Blue Ridge Behavioral Healthcare offices and clinic.

The location of his pharmacy was examined by archaeologists who found more than 30,000 artifacts, including some bottles still containing pills and Elixirs.

== Bibliography ==
- Barber, Michael B. 2011. "The Dr. Isaac D. Burrell Pharmacy (44RN256) Excavations: The Recovered Fauna". Quarterly Bulletin. 66, no. 2: 45–55. Archaeological Society of Virginia. Notes: Includes maps and photos. Burrell's pharmacy was located in the building of the former Davis Hotel at the corner of Gainsboro Road and Harrison Avenue.
- Chittum, Matt. 2017. Roanoke Times. "Death of Doctor Led to Hospital."Discover History & Heritage. August 2017. Pages 78–81.
- John T. Kneebone et al., eds., Dictionary of Virginia Biography (Richmond, 1998– ), 2:419–420.
- Richmond Planet, 15 July 1905
- Richmond Planet, 28 Mar. 1914.
