= Deborah Mathis =

American journalist

Deborah Myers Mathis (born 24 August 1953) is an American journalist and author. Her journalism career began as a reporter for the Arkansas Democrat, a major newspaper in Arkansas. She also worked in television news in Little Rock and Washington. She was White House correspondent for the Gannett News Service. She returned to Arkansas and newspaper journalism at the Arkansas Gazette as an editorial columnist and associate editor.

== Early life and education ==
Mathis was born in Little Rock, Arkansas on August 24, 1953, to Rev. Lloyd H. Myers and Rachel A. Helms Myers. She attended Gibbs Elementary, Rightsell Elementary, Westside Junior High, and Little Rock Central High School, where she was the first black and first female editor of the school's newspaper.

== Career ==
In 1973, Mathis became a reporter for Channel 11 Dateline News. Her career includes work as a reporter for the Arkansas Democrat and the Arkansas Gazette (now merged into the Arkansas Democrat-Gazette), and TV stations KARK-Channel 4 and KATV-Channel 7. She was also a columnist for the Arkansas Gazette, and the first Black member of the Arkansas Gazette editorial board. From 1993 to 2000 she was the White House correspondent for Gannett. In 2000, she was selected as a Fall Fellow at the Shorenstein Center on the Press, Politics and Public Policy at Harvard's Kennedy School of Government to examine the role of race in press coverage in a case study.

Throughout the 1990s, Mathis was a fixture on TV news and current event talk shows, including America's Black Forum and Oprah, and was a nationally syndicated columnist for Tribune Media Services. She has also appeared as a commentator on NPR.

Mathis was an assistant professor at Northwestern University's Medill School of Journalism. from 2003 to 2006.

== Works ==
- Mathis, Deborah (2002). Yet a Stranger: Why Black Americans Still Don't Feel at Home. Warner Books. ISBN 0-446-52636-3.
- Mathis, Deborah (2005). What God Can Do: How Faith Changes Lives for the Better. Simon and Schuster. ISBN 9781416510048.
- Mathis, Deborah (2007). Sole Sisters: The Joys and Pains of Single Black Women. Agate. ISBN 9781572846289.
- Mathis, Deborah; Smith, Gregory Todd (2015). Unlucky Number: The Murder of Lottery Winner Abraham Shakespeare. Penguin. ISBN 9780698159259.

== Honors and awards ==
- 2003, inducted into the Arkansas Black Hall of Fame

== Personal life ==
Now a freelance writer, Mathis lives in McLean, Virginia. She has three adult children and three granddaughters.
