= Valley Junior/Senior High School =

Valley Jr-Sr High School

Location
- 703 Stevenson Boulevard; New Kensington, Pennsylvania 15068; United States
- Coordinates: 40.566812°N 79.755775°W

Information
- Type: Public high school
- Motto: Valley Pride
- School district: New Kensington–Arnold School District
- Principal: Jon Banko
- Teaching staff: 59.00 (FTE)
- Grades: 7–12
- Enrollment: 885 (2023-2024)
- Student to teacher ratio: 15.00
- Colors: Black and gold
- Athletics conference: WPIAL(PIAA District 7)
- Team name: Vikings
- Website: vjshs.nkasd.com

Valley Junior/Senior High School is a public school in New Kensington, Westmoreland County in the state of Pennsylvania. According to the National Center for Education Statistics, in the 2018–2019 school year, the School reported an enrollment of 792 pupils in grades 9th through 12th.

== Demographics of student body ==
As of 2009.

| Subset | Number of students | Percent |
|---|---|---|
| All | 790 | 100% |
| White | 572 | 71.4% |
| African American | 201 | 26.1% |
| Asian | 4 | 0.5% |
| Hispanic | 8 | 1.00% |
| Multiracial | 0 | 0% |
| American Indian | 5 | 0.6% |
| Male | 381 | 48.2% |
| Female | 409 | 51.8% |

== Alternative education ==
Valley High School has an alternative education program for students with behavioral issues, those who have been chronically truant or are expelled from the traditional school programs. Students work toward graduation under the supervision of a teacher using online OdysseyWare software.

== Awards and recognition ==
Valley High School's Junior ROTC program was named an Honor Unit with Distinction in 2006 and 2009, scoring in the 96th percentile in an inspection held once every three years.

In 1998, a team of students representing Valley High School tied for third place in an international Space Settlement Design contest sponsored by NASA, for their research project, entitled "Space Colonies, A Design Study."

== Ten Commandments controversy ==
On March 20, 2012, the Freedom From Religion Foundation (FFRF) sent a letter of complaint about a large granite monument with 10 Commandments predominantly displayed near the main entrance to the school, citing that the school is in violation of the establishment clause of the First Amendment.

On October 13, 2012, approximately 50 people attended a rally in support of keeping the monument at Valley High School.

On September 14, 2012, the FFRF and four New Kensington residents filed suit against the school district seeking a declaration that the monument is unconstitutional, a permanent injunction directing its removal, nominal damages and costs and attorneys’ fees. The Judge, Terrance McVerry ruled on Dec. 19, 2012 allowing the plaintiffs the right to use pseudonyms. On Jan. 22, 2013 he denied the motion to dismiss, allowing the case to continue.

On July 27, 2015, the District Court ruled that the Plaintiffs did not have standing.

On August 9, 2016 the U.S. Third Circuit Court of Appeals unanimously ruled that Plaintiff Marie Schaub had standing and remanded the case back to Judge Terrance McVerry to be heard on its merits. On February 21, 2017, the lawsuit came to an end when the school district agreed to remove the monument from in front of the school and for the school district, through their insurance company, to pay $163,500 in legal fees, including more than $40,000 to the Freedom From Religion Foundation. In accord with the agreement, the monument was removed on March 21, 2017. It was donated to a local elementary Catholic school, Mary Queen of Apostles, where it currently resides.

== Extracurriculars ==
New Kensington-Arnold School District offers a wide variety of clubs, activities and an extensive sports program.

=== Athletics ===
| Sport | Boys | Girls |
|---|---|---|
| Baseball / Softball | Class AAAA | Class AAA |
| Basketball | Class AAA | Class AAA |
| Cross country | Class AAA | Class AA |
| Football | Class AA | |
| Golf | Class A | |
| Soccer | Class AA | Class AA |
| Swimming and Diving | Class AA | Class AA |
| Tennis | Class AA | (Team) Class AA |
| Track and Field | Class AA | Class AA |
| Volleyball | | Class AA |
| Wrestling | Class AA | |

== Vocational–technical education ==
Students in grades 10–12 may attend the Northern Westmoreland Career and Technology Center part-time, if elected.

== Notable alumni ==
- Chipper Harris, basketball player.
- Tyler Santucci, NFL football coach
- Willie Thrower, the first African-American quarterback to play for the NFL, playing for the 1953 Chicago Bears.
