= America's Black Forum =

- Genre: News magazine
- Presented by: Marc Morial hosts the revived America's Black Forum, premiering October 2, 2021. James Brown; Juan Williams; Armstrong Williams; Deborah Mathis; Charles Ogletree; Marc Morial
- Country of origin: United States
- Original language: English
- No. of seasons: 29

Production
- Executive producers: John Gloster and Walker Williams; then Byron Lewis Sr. (original, 1977-2006); Don Jackson (revived series)
- Camera setup: Single-camera
- Running time: 60 minutes (original, 1977-2006); 30 minutes (revival, 2021-future)
- Production companies: UniWorld Group (original, 1977-2006); Central City Productions Inc. (revival, 2021-future)

Original release
- Network: First-run syndication
- Release: 1977 – present

America's Black Forum is a nationally syndicated weekly news broadcast targeted to an African American audience. The show started in 1977, and is one of the longest running U.S. syndicated television series.

As of 2021, the new series is hosted by Marc Morial of the National Urban League. The original show has been presented by James Brown and Juan Williams, and featured such commentators as Armstrong Williams, Deborah Mathis and Charles Ogletree.

Central City Productions, Inc. currently owns the rights to America's Black Forum. America's Black Forum was owned by Byron Lewis Sr, Chair, founder of UniWorld Group in the 1970s. Lewis' son, Byron Lewis Jr., was installed as a Writer and Producer. 'Sweet Auburn' was one of the films ABF produced. In 2005, America’s Black Forum was sold to New Millennium, a joint venture between Central City Productions, Inc. and Graves Ventures, owner of Black Enterprise. In 2016 Central City Productions took over the ownership of America’s Black Forum.

In 2021, Central City Productions is reviving the series as a half-hour program with the same format, slated to premiere in October 2021 with Marc Morial serving as the host for the revival series.

As of 2021, the show will air in National Broadcast Syndication. The show was previously broadcast on TV One.

Lavonia Perryman Fairfax was an executive producer of the original America Black Forum in the 1980s. She produced the Emmy Award Jesse Jackson Presidential Campaign special.
