= Charles Ogletree =

American attorney and law professor (1952–2023)

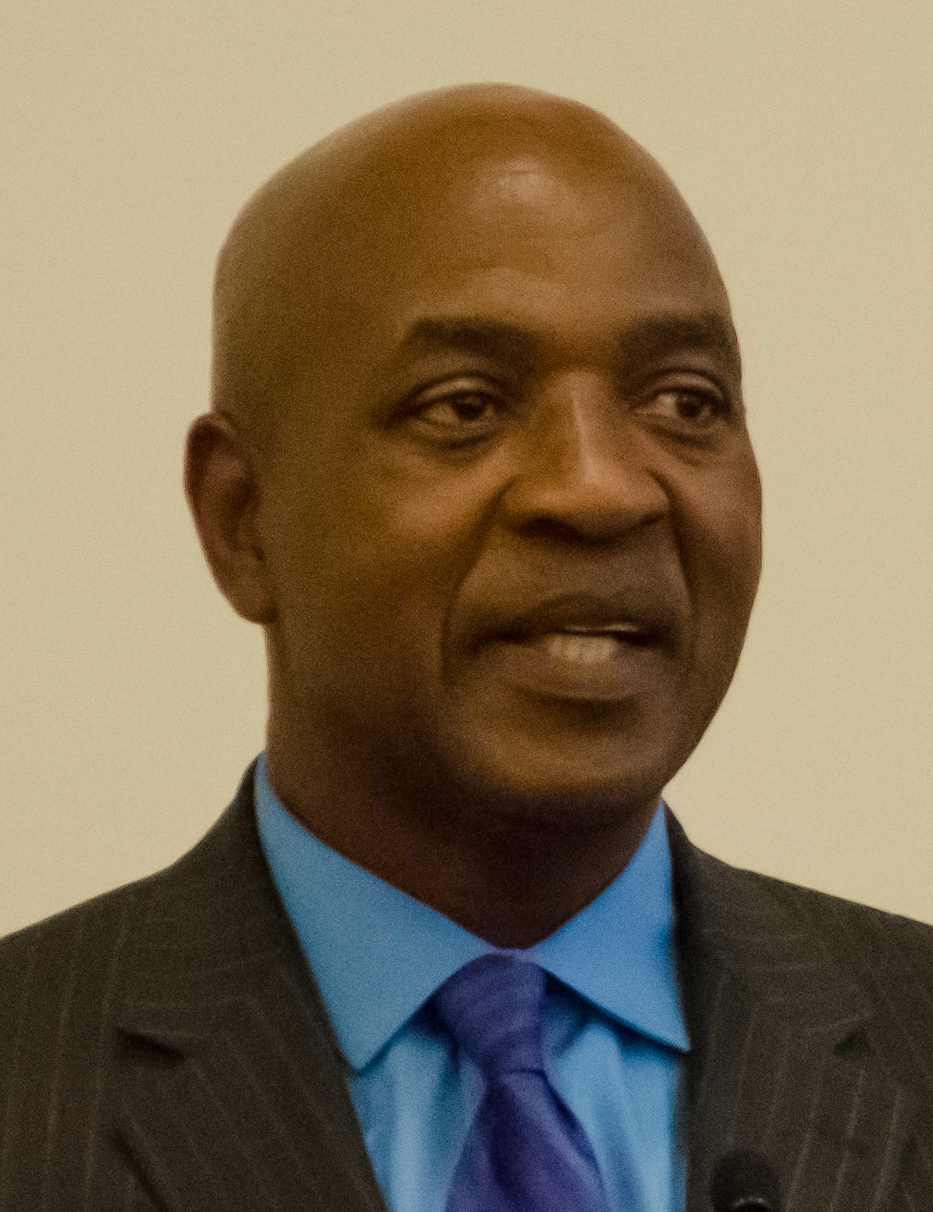
- Ogletree in 2014
- Born: Charles James Ogletree Jr. December 31, 1952; Merced, California, U.S.
- Died: August 4, 2023 (aged 70); Odenton, Maryland, U.S.
- Education: Stanford University (BA, MA); Harvard University (JD)
- Political party: Democratic
- Spouse: Pamela Barnes (m. 1975)
- Children: 2
- Website: University website

Charles James Ogletree Jr. (December 31, 1952 – August 4, 2023) was an American legal scholar who served as the Jesse Climenko Professor at Harvard Law School, where he was the founder of the school's Charles Hamilton Houston Institute for Race and Justice. He was also the author of books on legal topics.

== Early life and education ==
Ogletree was born on December 31, 1952, in Merced, California, to parents who were farm workers. They later divorced. He earned both his B.A. (1974, with distinction) and M.A. (1975) in political science from Stanford University and then his J.D. from Harvard Law School in 1978. While in law school he became president of the Black American Law Students Association (later known as the National Black Law Students Association).

== Career ==
=== Lawyer and professor ===
After graduating from law school, Ogletree worked for the District of Columbia Public Defender Service until 1985, first as a staff attorney, then as training director, trial chief, and deputy director. As an attorney, he represented such notable figures as Tupac Shakur and Anita Hill.

In 1985, Harvard Law School hired Ogletree as a visiting professor, promoting him in 1989 to assistant professor. His area of specialization was clinical legal practice, including "the role of public defenders in society."

In 1990 he founded the Criminal Justice Institute, according to The Harvard Crimson "a clinic program through which law students represent indigent Boston-area clients in criminal court."

In 1992, Ogletree became the Jesse Climenko Professor of Law and vice dean for clinical programs. From 2001 to 2002, he was the Wayne Morse Chair of Law and Politics, established in honor of the late former Senator, at the University of Oregon.

=== Media appearances and contributions ===
Moderator of television programs, including State of the Black Union; Where Do We Go from Here: Chaos or Community; (with others) Ethics in America; Hard Drugs, Hard Choices, Liberty and Limits: Whose Law, Whose Order?; Credibility in the Newsroom, Race to Execution, 2006; Beyond Black and White; Liberty & Limits: Whose Law, Whose Order?; That Delicate Balance II: Our Bill of Rights; and other Public Broadcasting Service broadcasts.

Television programs he was a guest on include Nightline, This Week with David Brinkley, McNeil-Lehrer News Hour, Crossfire, Today Show, Good Morning America, Larry King Live, Cochran and Company: Burden of Proof, Tavis Smiley, Frontline, America's Black Forum, and Meet the Press.

He was a consultant to NBC news on the O. J. Simpson murder case, which he predicted would end in a "hung jury or an acquittal." Interviewed about the case ten years later, Ogletree described it as one in which "the system worked," saying "At every significant point in this case, the government presented evidence, and the defense rebutted it with overwhelming evidence to the contrary. When you have that, even though there is an assumption of guilt, even though there is a suspicion of guilt, even though there is a deep-seated feeling of guilt, the system says if you don't have an abiding conviction that the person is guilty, you have to find them not guilty."

Ogletree contributed to periodicals such as New Crisis, Public Utilities Fortnightly, and Harvard Law Review.

In February 2011, he gave a three-part lecture at Harvard Law School entitled "Understanding Obama", which provides an inside look at President Barack Obama's journey from boyhood in Hawaii to the White House.

Ogletree appeared in the 2013 documentary film, Justice is a Black Woman: The Life and Works of Constance Baker Motley and in the 2014 documentary, Hate Crimes in the Heartland, providing an analysis of the Tulsa race massacre.

=== Community and professional affairs ===
Ogletree was a member of the board of trustees at Stanford University. He founded the Merced, California scholarships. He was the chairman of the board of trustees of University of the District of Columbia. While a student at Harvard Law School, he was elected national president of the Black Law Students Association.

=== Stature and public life ===
Ogletree taught both Barack and Michelle Obama at Harvard; he remained close to Barack Obama throughout his political career.

Ogletree wrote opinion pieces on the state of race in the United States for major publications. Ogletree also served as the moderator for a panel discussion on civil rights in baseball on March 28, 2008, that accompanied the second annual Major League Baseball civil rights exhibition game the following day between the New York Mets and the Chicago White Sox.

On July 21, 2009, Ogletree issued a statement in response to the arrest of his Harvard colleague and client, Professor Henry Louis Gates Jr., whose arrest at his own home became a major news story about the nexus of politics, police power, and race that summer. Professor Ogletree later wrote a book about the events titled The Presumption of Guilt: The Arrest of Henry Louis Gates, Jr. and Race, Class and Crime in America.

Ogletree was a founder of the Benjamin Banneker Charter Public School and served on the school's foundation board. The school library is named in his honor.

=== Plagiarism ===
In 2004, Harvard disciplined Ogletree for the plagiarism of six paragraphs from Yale scholar Jack Balkin's book, What Brown v. Board of Education Should Have Said in his own book, All Deliberate Speed: Reflections on the First Half-Century of Brown v. Board of Education. Ogletree apologized, saying that he "made a serious mistake during the editorial process of completing this book, and delegated too much responsibility to others during the final editing process." Former Harvard President Derek C. Bok concluded, "There was no deliberate wrongdoing at all ... He marshaled his assistants and parceled out the work and in the process some quotation marks got lost."

== Illness and death ==
In 2014, Ogletree's wife started noticing health issues when he was 60 years old. He was diagnosed with Alzheimer's disease at age 62 in May 2015. On July 13, 2016, Ogletree announced he had been diagnosed with early-stage Alzheimer's disease. In 2019, Ogletree went missing and was found safe by the police after an extensive missing persons search.

Ogletree died on August 4, 2023, at the age of 70.

== Awards and honors ==
Ogletree received the National Conference on Black Lawyers People's Lawyer of the Year Award, the Man of Vision Award, Museum of Afro-American History (Boston), the Albert Sacks-Paul A. Freund Award for Teaching Excellence, Harvard Law School in 1993, the Ellis Island Medal of Honor, 1995, the Ruffin-Fenwick Trailblazer Award, and the 21st Century Achievement Award, Urban League of Eastern Massachusetts.

In 2017, the Charles J. Ogletree Jr. Chair in Race and Criminal Justice was established at Harvard Law School in his honor.

== Works ==
=== Books ===
- Beyond the Rodney King Story: An Investigation of Police Conduct in Minority Communities (ed. with others, Northeastern University Press Boston, Massachusetts 1995)
- Brown at 50: The Unfinished Legacy (ed. with Deborah L. Rhode, American Bar Association 2004)
- All Deliberate Speed: Reflections on the First Half-Century of Brown v. Board of Education (W.W. Norton & Company 2004)
- From Lynch Mobs to the Killing State: Race and the Death Penalty in America (ed. with Austin Sarat, New York University Press 2006)
- The Presumption of Guilt: The Arrest of Henry Louis Gates, Jr. and Race, Class and Crime in America (Palgrave-Macmillan 2010)
- When Law Fails (Charles J. Ogletree & Austin Sarat eds.)
- Life without Parole: America's New Death Penalty? (ed. with Austin Sarat, New York University Press 2012)

=== Book chapters ===
- Faith of Our Fathers: African-American Men Reflect on Fatherhood ed. by Andre C. Willis
- Reason and Passion: Justice Brennan's Enduring Influence
- Ogletree, Charles J. "The Tireless Warrior for Racial Justice" in Reason (Rosenkranz & Schwartz eds., 1998).
- Ogletree, Charles J. "Privileges and Immunities for Basketball Stars and Other Sport Heroes?" in Basketball Jones (Boyd & Shropshire eds., 2000).
- Ogletree, Charles J. "The Challenge of Race and Education" in How to Make Black America Better (Smiley ed., 2001).
- Lift Every Voice and Sing, 2001
- The Rehnquist Court: Judicial Activism on the Right, 2002.
- Ogletree, Charles J. "The Rehnquist Revolution in Criminal Procedure" in The Rehnquist Court (Herman Schwartz ed., Hill and Wang Publishing, 2002).

=== Articles ===
- Ogletree, Charles J. "Race Relations and Conflicts in the United States The Limits of Hate Speech: Does Race Matter?" 32 Gonzaga Law Review 491 (1997).
- Ogletree, Charles J. "The Conference on Critical Race Theory: When the Rainbow Is Not Enough". 31 New England Law Review 705 (1997).
- Ogletree, Charles J. "The President's Role in Bridging America's Racial Divide". 15 Thomas M. Cooley Law Review 11 (1998).
- Ogletree, Charles J. "Matthew O. Tobriner Memorial Lecture: The Burdens and Benefits of Race in America". 25 Hastings Constitutional Law Quarterly 219 (1998).
- Ogletree, Charles J. "Personal and Professional Integrity in the Legal Profession: Lessons from President Clinton and Kenneth Starr". 56 Washington & Lee Law Review 851 (1999).
- Ogletree, Charles J. "A. Leon Higginbotham's Civil Rights Legacy". 34 Harvard Civil-Rights Civil Liberties Law Review 1 (1999).
- Ogletree, Charles J. "America's Schizophrenic Immigration Policy: Race, Class, and Reason". 41 Boston College Law Review 755 (2000).
- Ogletree, Charles J. "A Tribute to Gary Bellow: The Visionary Clinical Scholar". 114 Harvard Law Review 420 (2000).
- Ogletree, Charles J. "A. Leon Higginbotham, Jr.: A Reciprocal Legacy of Scholarship and Advocacy". 53 Rutgers Law Review 665 (2001).
- Ogletree, Charles J. "An Ode to St. Peter: Professor Peter M. Cicchino". 50 American University Law Review 591 (2001).
- Ogletree, Charles J. "Unequal Justice for Al Sharpton". Africana.com, August 21, 2001.
- Ogletree, Charles J. "Fighting a Just War Without an Unjust Loss of Freedom," Africana.com, October 11, 2001.
- Ogletree, Charles J. "From Pretoria to Philadelphia: Judge Higginbotham's Racial Justice Jurisprudence on South Africa and the United States". 20 Yale Law and Policy Review 383 (2002).
- Ogletree, Charles J. "The Challenge of Providing Legal Representation in the United States, South Africa and China". 7 Washington University Journal of Law and Policy 47 (2002).
- Ogletree, Charles J. "Judicial Activism or Judicial Necessity: D.C. Court's Criminal Justice Legacy". 90 Georgetown Law Journal 685 (2002).
- Ogletree, Charles J. "Black Man's Burden: Race and the Death Penalty in America". 81 Oregon Law Review 15 (2002).
- Ogletree, Charles J. "The Right's and Wrongs of e-Privacy". Optimize Magazine. March 2002.
- Ogletree, Charles J. "A Diverse Workforce in the 21st Century: Harvard's Challenge". Harvard Community Resource. Spring 2002.
- Ogletree, Charles J. "Repairing the Past: New Efforts in the Reparations Debate in America". 2 Harvard Civil Rights- Civil Liberties Law Review 38 (2003).
- Ogletree, Charles J. "Reparations for the Children of Slaves: Litigating the Issues". 2 University of Memphis Law Review 33 (2003).
- Ogletree, Charles J. "The Current Reparations Debate". 5 University of California Davis Law Review 36 (2003).
- Ogletree, Charles J. "Does America Owe Us? (Point-Counterpoint with E.R. Shipp, on the Topic of Reparations)". Essence Magazine. February 2003.
- Ogletree, Charles J. "The Case for Reparations". USA Weekend Magazine. February 2003.
- Ogletree, Charles J. "Commentary: All Deliberate Speed: Reflections on the First Half-Century of Brown vs. Board of Education". 66 Montana Law Review 283 (2005).
- Ogletree, Charles J. "All Deliberate Speed?: Brown's Past and Brown's Future". 107 West Virginia Law Review 625 (2005).

=== Articles in a Newspaper ===
- Ogletree, Charles J. "Why Has the G.O.P. Kept Blacks Off Federal Courts?". The New York Times. August 18, 2000, Op-Ed.
- Ogletree, Charles J. "The Court's Tarnished Reputation". Boston Globe. December 12, 2000, Op-Ed.
- Ogletree, Charles J. "The Real David Brock". Boston Globe. June 30, 2001, Op-Ed.
- Ogletree, Charles J. "The U.S. Needn't Shrink from Durban". Los Angeles Times. August 29, 2001, Op-Ed.
- Ogletree, Charles J. "Litigating the Legacy of Slavery". The New York Times. March 31, 2002, Op-Ed.
- Ogletree, Charles J. "The Future of Admissions and Race". Boston Globe. May 20, 2002, Op-Ed.
- Ogletree, Charles J. "Court Should Stand By Bake Ruling". Boston Globe. April 1, 2003, Op-Ed.

=== Reports or Studies ===
- Ogletree, Charles J. "Judicial Excellence, Judicial Diversity: The African American Federal Judges Report" (2003).

=== Presentations ===
- Ogletree, Charles J. Sobota Lecture, Albany School of Law (Spring 2002).
- Ogletree, Charles J. Mangels Lecturship, University of Washington Graduate School (Spring 2002).
- Ogletree, Charles J. Northeastern University Valerie Gordon Human Rights Lecture, Northeastern University School of Law (April 2002).
- Ogletree, Charles J. Why Reparations? Why Now?, Buck Franklin Memorial Lecture and Conference on Reparations, University of Tulsa College of Law, Oklahoma (September 25, 2002).
- Ogletree, Charles J. University of California-Davis Barrett Lecture: The Current Reparations Debate, University of California-Davis Law School (October 22, 2002)
- Ogletree, Charles J. Baum Lecture, University of Illinois Urbana-Champaign (November 2002).
- Ogletree, Charles J. Remembering Dr. King's Legacy: Promoting Diversity and Promoting Patriotism, King County Bar Association MLK Luncheon (January 17, 2003).
- Ogletree, Charles J. Grinnell College Special Convocation Address (January 22, 2003).
- Ogletree, Charles J. A Call to Arms: Responding to W.E.B. DuBois's Challenge to Wilberforce, Wilberforce University Founder's Day Luncheon (February 11, 2003).
