= Burrell Communications Group =

Ad Agency founded by one of the first African Americans in the industry

- Industry: Advertising
- Founded: 1971
- Founders: Thomas J. Burrell, Emmett McBain
- Headquarters: Chicago, Illinois, USA
- Key people: Fay Ferguson, McGhee Osse, co-chief executive officers Lewis Williams, chief creative officer
- Website: www.burrell.com

Burrell Communications Group L.L.C. is an American advertising agency founded by chairman emeritus Thomas (Tom) J. Burrell and headquartered in Chicago, IL. It is one of the largest multi-cultural marketing firms in the world. The company's assignments have been discussed by The New York Times. Some of the company's work is part of a collection in the Library of Congress.

== History ==
Burrell Communications was founded in 1971 by Tom Burrell and then-partner Emmett McBain, and was originally named Burrell McBain. When McBain left in 1974, Burrell renamed the agency to Burrell Communications Group.

The company had been established to attempt to forge an authentic and respectful relationship with African-American consumers, and to utilise how the black aesthetic could also appeal to general market consumers. It was at this time that Burrell coined the phrase "Black people are not dark-skinned white people." Recognizing that there existed inherent cultural differences, and the fact that these differences drove patterns of consumption, became a driving force and inspiration for future ad campaigns at Burrell. They had established a leading shop for niche African American-focused communications, beginning with the Black Marlboro Man for Philip Morris. Their list of accounts quickly expanded to include the large brands McDonald's and Coca-Cola. A Coca-Cola commercial entitled "Street Song" won Burrell its first Clio Award. By 1979, Burrell topped $10 million in billing per annum, making it one of the most successful multi-cultural advertising shops in the United States.

Other accounts they added included Martell Cognac and Stroh's accounts (1981–1983). Burrell's "Double Dutch" Commercial for McDonald's gained national attention and a Gold Award at the U.S. Television Commercials Festival. By 1996, agency billing climbed to $20 million. To better serve Coca-Cola, Burrell opened an office in Atlanta, GA. More work came from Procter and Gamble, Crest Toothpaste, Polaroid and Kraft Foods Stovetop Dressing.

The agency was awarded the Grand Effie by the American Marketing Association for its work on "Who Wants," a spot created for the Partnership for a Drug Free America. Burrell gained new clients including Nynex, Mobil, Nabisco's A1 Steak Sauce, Maxwell House Coffee and Sears. Agency billing topped at $128 million. Burrell later acquired DFA Communications, a general market advertising and direct marketing agency based in New York, gaining direct marketing expertise as well as a New York presence.

=== 49% sold to fund expansion ===
In 1999, they sold a 49% minority stake to French media giant Publicis Groupe in order to fund its expansion. Burrell Communications was awarded projects by Toyota, Hewlett-Packard and General Mills.

=== 21st century ===
In 2002, Burrell was named Black Enterprise's Advertising Agency of the Year.

Tom Burrell retired in 2004. The agency launched the Toyota Camry in 2007 with "If Looks Could Kill," the first digital campaign of its kind to target African-American women. In 2009, they were granted the American Airlines account, and a Toyota ad was on the Super Bowl.

==== 2010s ====
2010: Burrell launches Threshold Nation, a subsidiary dedicated to marketing toward the multi-ethnic urban male.

2011: Burrell Communications is named Black Enterprise's Advertising Agency of the Year and adds Comcast to its list of clients.

2013: Burrell launches Rising Tide, a Tide-sponsored aspirational social network for millennials looking for professional access. The program featured hip-hop media mogul Russell Simmons, who shared his advice with the young, professional audience.

2014: Burrell launched the 2013 Toyota Avalon "Only The Name Remains" campaign, starring Academy Award nominee Idris Elba. The campaign won a Gold National ADDY Award, was an Official Webby Award Honoree, and was listed as the FWA Site of the Day.

2019: Entrepreneur and writer Christine Michel Carter named Burrell Communications Group as one of the largest global multicultural marketing firms.

== Clients ==
Some of their major clients have been using their services for over 30 years, including:

- McDonald's
- Comcast
- Procter and Gamble
- General Mills
- SuperValu
- American Airlines
- Toyota
- Lilly
- Disney's Dreamers Academy

== Industry awards ==
- Clio award
- Grand Effie
- Black Enterprise's Advertising Agency of the Year (2002)
- Black Enterprise's Advertising Agency of the Year (2011)

== See also ==
- UWG Inc. (Uniworld Group)
