= Burrel, California =

Unincorporated community in California, United States

Burrel
- Unincorporated community
- Location in California Burrel (the United States)
- Coordinates: 36°29′18″N 119°59′07″W
- Country: United States
- State: California
- County: Fresno
- Elevation: 203 ft (62 m)
- ZIP code: 93607

Burrel (formerly Burrell) is an unincorporated community in Fresno County, California, United States. It is located 30 miles (48 km) southwest of Fresno, at an elevation of 203 feet (62 m).

Burrel is located midway between California State Route 99 and Interstate 5.

The place is named for Cuthbert Burrel, owner of a nearby ranch. In the 1850s and 1860s, nearby Elkhorn Station functioned as a stage stop. A post office was established at Burrel in 1912, but was eventually shut down, with mail now routed through nearby Riverdale. By 1971, Burrel had only 43 residents, a store, and a post office.

Burrel's only school is Burrel Union Elementary, which serves kindergarten through eighth grades. Students in the district usually attend high school in Riverdale.
