= Lower Burrell, Pennsylvania =

City in Pennsylvania, US

- City
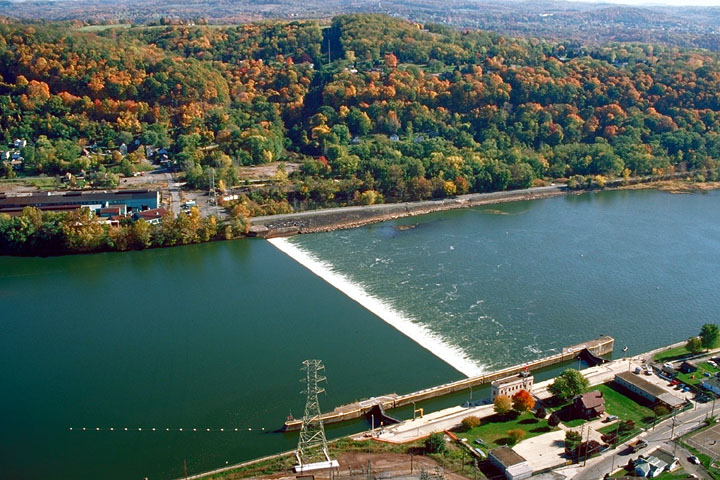
- Allegheny River Lock and Dam No. 4

- Logo

- Location of Lower Burrell in Westmoreland County, Pennsylvania.

- Location within Pennsylvania Location within the United States
- Coordinates: 40°35′02″N 79°43′19″W
- Country: United States
- State: Pennsylvania
- County: Westmoreland
- Settled: 1852
- Incorporated (city): 1959

Government
  - Type: City council
  - Mayor: Chris Fabry (R)

Area
  - Total: 11.52 sq mi (29.83 km^{2})
  - Land: 11.27 sq mi (29.19 km^{2})
  - Water: 0.25 sq mi (0.65 km^{2})

Population (2020)
  - Total: 11,758
  - Density: 1,043.4/sq mi (402.84/km^{2})
- Time zone: UTC-5 (Eastern (EST))
  - Summer (DST): UTC-4 (EDT)
- Zip code: 15068
- FIPS code: 42-44864
- Website: http://www.cityoflowerburrell.com/

Lower Burrell is a city in northern Westmoreland County, Pennsylvania, United States, along the Allegheny River. Located approximately 18 miles northeast of downtown Pittsburgh, it is part of the Pittsburgh metropolitan area. The population was 11,758 at the 2020 census.

== History ==
The region in which Lower Burrell is located was originally part of the hunting reserves of the Iroquois. Permanent European settlement began in the 1760s, and Westmoreland County was created in 1773. In 1852, due to an increase in population in the area, Burrell Township was carved out of Allegheny Township on court order of Judge Jeremiah Murry Burrell. In 1879 Burrell Township was divided into two separate townships, Lower Burrell and Upper Burrell. The present-day cities of New Kensington and Arnold were once part of Lower Burrell Township. In the years that followed, Lower Burrell transformed from a quiet, rural farm community to a residential and commercial area while Upper Burrell stayed primarily rural. Upper Burrell Township is still somewhat rural, though it has experienced some suburban growth and sprawl in recent years.

In 1959, in the midst of the growth of their community, township residents voted to make Lower Burrell a third class city. Lower Burrell continued to grow substantially until the 1980s. Like many communities in Western Pennsylvania, Lower Burrell suffered economic and population stagnation with the collapse of local heavy industry. Since the early 1990s, Lower Burrell experienced slight growth, though one of its only large shopping centers remains mostly vacant. Preliminary data from the 2010 census shows that Lower Burrell has lost about 5 percent of its population since 2000.

The Allegheny River Lock and Dam No. 4 was listed on the National Register of Historic Places in 2000.

== Geography ==
Lower Burrell is located at 40°35′2″N 79°43′19″W (40.583966, -79.721948).

According to the United States Census Bureau, the city has a total area of 11.8 square miles (31 km^{2}), of which 11.6 square miles (30 km^{2}) is land and 0.3 square miles (0.78 km^{2}) (2.28%) is water.

Informally, the city is divided into different neighborhoods and areas including Bon Air, Braeburn, Braeburn Heights, Central City, Edgecliff, Gladeview, Indian Fields I & II and Kinloch. Lower Burrell's central Business District overlaps Bon Air-Central City-Gladeview neighborhoods.

Lower Burrell is located in the Appalachian Plateau, the western portion of the Appalachian Mountain range. The landscape varies greatly, with large swaths of flat land (typically in Bon Air, Central City and Gladeview) to areas with gentle slopes, and even steep cliffs and hillsides in certain areas. The city is bounded on the north and southwestern corner by the Allegheny River. Jacks Island, a river island approximately 0.96 km (0.60 mi) in length, is located near the Braeburn neighborhood.

=== Streams ===
- Pucketa Creek joins the Allegheny River where the creek forms the boundary between both the city of Lower Burrell and the borough of Plum.
- Little Pucketa Creek joins Pucketa Creek at Lower Burrell.
- Chartiers Run joins the Allegheny River at Lower Burrell.

== Demographics ==
Historical population
Census	Pop.	Note	%±
1960	11,952		—
1970	13,654		14.2%
1980	13,200		−3.3%
1990	12,251		−7.2%
2000	12,608		2.9%
2010	11,761		−6.7%
2020	11,758		0.0%

=== 2020 census ===
As of the 2020 census, Lower Burrell had a population of 11,758. The median age was 49.6 years. 17.9% of residents were under the age of 18 and 25.9% of residents were 65 years of age or older. For every 100 females there were 93.6 males, and for every 100 females age 18 and over there were 92.4 males age 18 and over.

89.0% of residents lived in urban areas, while 11.0% lived in rural areas.

There were 5,171 households in Lower Burrell, of which 23.1% had children under the age of 18 living in them. Of all households, 49.5% were married-couple households, 17.5% were households with a male householder and no spouse or partner present, and 27.2% were households with a female householder and no spouse or partner present. About 31.7% of all households were made up of individuals and 17.2% had someone living alone who was 65 years of age or older.

There were 5,502 housing units, of which 6.0% were vacant. The homeowner vacancy rate was 1.6% and the rental vacancy rate was 4.6%.

Racial composition as of the 2020 census
Race	Number	Percent
White	11,008	93.6%
Black or African American	180	1.5%
American Indian and Alaska Native	9	0.1%
Asian	69	0.6%
Native Hawaiian and Other Pacific Islander	0	0.0%
Some other race	62	0.5%
Two or more races	430	3.7%
Hispanic or Latino (of any race)	151	1.3%

=== 2000 census ===
As of the census of 2000, there were 12,608 people, 5,133 households, and 3,654 families residing in the city. The population density was 1,091.8 inhabitants per square mile (421.5/km^{2}). There were 5,324 housing units at an average density of 461.0 per square mile (178.0/km^{2}). The racial makeup of the city was 97.95% White, 0.93% African American, 0.03% Native American, 0.36% Asian, 0.02% Pacific Islander, 0.10% from other races, and 0.62% from two or more races. Hispanic or Latino of any race were 0.44% of the population.

There were 5,133 households, out of which 27.6% had children under the age of 18 living with them, 58.6% were married couples living together, 9.4% had a female householder with no husband present, and 28.8% were non-families. 25.8% of all households were made up of individuals, and 15.6% had someone living alone who was 65 years of age or older. The average household size was 2.41 and the average family size was 2.90.

In the city, the population was spread out, with 21.5% under the age of 18, 5.7% from 18 to 24, 25.8% from 25 to 44, 24.3% from 45 to 64, and 22.7% who were 65 years of age or older. The median age was 43 years. For every 100 females, there were 89.0 males. For every 100 females age 18 and over, there were 86.4 males.

The median income for a household in the city was $41,000, and the median income for a family was $50,036. Males had a median income of $38,900 versus $25,706 for females. The per capita income for the city was $20,143. About 4.3% of families and 6.5% of the population were below the poverty line, including 8.0% of those under age 18 and 3.3% of those age 65 or over.

== Government ==
=== Officials ===
Lower Burrell is a third class city in the Commonwealth of Pennsylvania. It has a commission form of government where the mayor of the city only has one vote and no veto power. The mayor heads the City's Department of Public Affairs, which oversees the Lower Burrell Police Department, City Clerk, Solicitor, Health Department, Ordinance Officer, Animal Control Officer, Emergency Management Department, Auxiliary Police, Fire Code Enforcement Officer and School Crossing Guards. In addition to the mayor, Lower Burrell has four councilmen. Each councilman heads a different department including the Department of Accounts and Finance, Department of Parks and Public Property, Department of Public Safety and the Department of Streets and Improvements. The current mayor is Chris Fabry, a Republican elected in 2023 and sworn in on January 3, 2024.

=== Police department ===
The Lower Burrell Police Department is staffed by 17 full-time police officers, including a Chief of Police and two divisions made up of the Detective and Patrol/Traffic department. The department has a new K-9 officer, Patrolman Rodgers, and his K-9 partner, Buc.

=== Fire and ambulance services ===
Lower Burrell is served by two volunteer fire companies. Lower Burrell Fire Company 1 is located in the Kinloch section of the city. Lower Burrell Fire Company 3 serves the Bon Air, Central City and Gladeview neighborhoods, the business district, Braeburn and Braeburn Heights. Fire Company 4 used to serve the Braeburn and Braeburn Heights areas in the city. Fire Company 2, was formerly located in Braeburn and merged into Company 4 in 2005. Company 4, in turn, was closed in 2009. Lower Burrell's EMS coverage is provided by Company 3. The city has approximately 100 volunteer firefighters.

== Education ==
Lower Burrell and Upper Burrell Township are jointly served by the Burrell School District. The district consists of Bon Air Elementary (K-4th), the Charles A. Huston Middle School, and Burrell High School.

On a post-secondary level, Lower Burrell was once home to Newport Business Institute and Oakbridge Academy of Arts, both located in the Kinloch neighborhood. The for-profit schools shut down in the middle of a school day on December 16, 2013. Penn State New Kensington is located in nearby Upper Burrell Township and a branch campus of Westmoreland County Community College is in neighboring New Kensington.

== Notable people ==
- Jason Altmire, former member of the U.S. House of Representatives
- Pete Babando, NHL player for Detroit Red Wings and winner of the 1950 Stanley Cup
- Shane Black, film director, producer, screenwriter and actor
- Tom Brown, NFL running back for the Miami Dolphins
- Linda Drane Burdick, prosecutor known for State of Florida vs. Casey Anthony
- Stefan Lundberg, former soccer player for the Pittsburgh Riverhounds
- Leonard R. Olijar, accountant and director of the Bureau of Engraving and Printing
- Tom Squitieri, journalist and former foreign correspondent for USA Today
