= Upper Burrell Township, Pennsylvania =

Township in Pennsylvania, US

Coordinates: 40°33′19″N 79°40′30″W

- Township
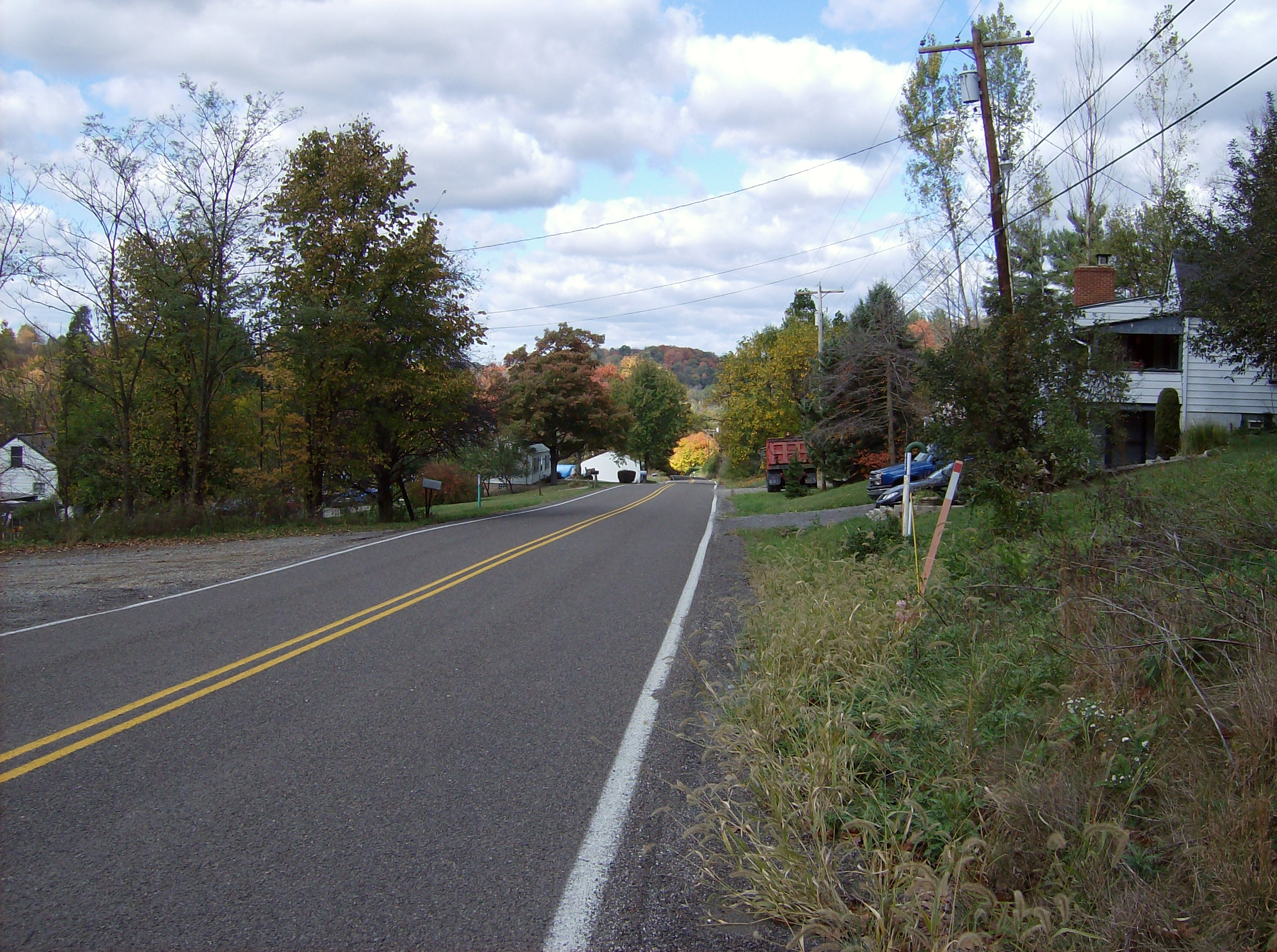
- A typical road in Upper Burrell Township

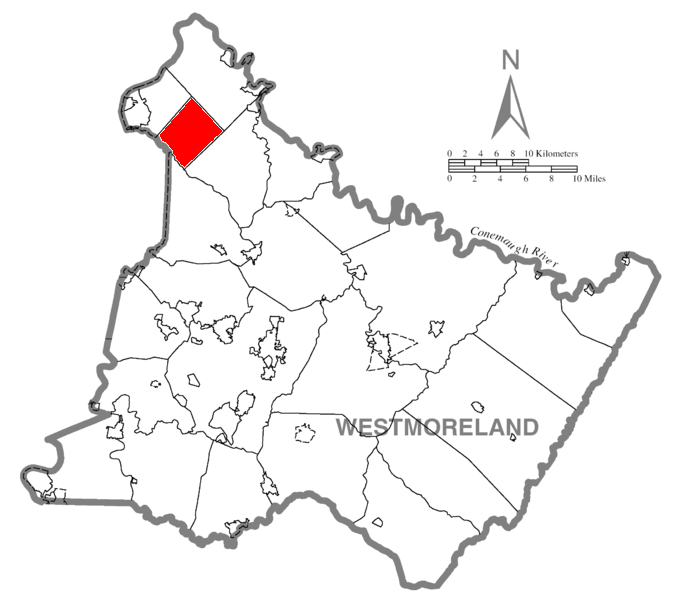
- Map of Westmoreland County, Pennsylvania Highlighting Upper Burrell Township

- Map of Pennsylvania highlighting Westmoreland County
- Country: United States
- State: Pennsylvania
- County: Westmoreland
- Settled: 1791
- Incorporated: 1879

Area
  - Total: 15.13 sq mi (39.19 km^{2})
  - Land: 15.13 sq mi (39.19 km^{2})
  - Water: 0 sq mi (0.00 km^{2})

Population (2020)
  - Total: 2,159 ▼
  - Estimate (2021): 2,141
  - Density: 149.0/sq mi (57.54/km^{2})
- Time zone: UTC-5 (Eastern (EST))
  - Summer (DST): UTC-4 (EDT)
- FIPS code: 42-129-78768
- Website: http://www.upperburrelltwp.com

Upper Burrell Township is a township in Westmoreland County, Pennsylvania, United States, within the Pittsburgh metropolitan area. The population was 2,159 at the 2020 census.

== History ==
Northern Westmoreland County was once part of the hunting grounds of the Iroquois Five Nations, first settled by Europeans in the 1760s. In 1852, Allegheny Township, which covered nearly all of the northeastern corner of Westmoreland County, was divided into smaller districts to accommodate a growing population. One of these became Burrell Township, which in 1879 was divided into Lower and Upper Burrell townships. In the 1890s, Lower Burrell was further divided into the cities of New Kensington and Arnold. Farming, coal mining, and milling were the mainstays of the local economy in the 19th and early 20th century. There are several historic buildings from that era still standing in Upper Burrell Township; the Byerly House was added to the National Register of Historic Places in 1985.

== Geography ==
According to the United States Census Bureau, the township has a total area of 15.2 square miles (39.3 km^{2}), all land.

Upper Burrell is the site of Penn State New Kensington, and a large research facility of Alcoa.

== Demographics ==
Historical population
Census	Pop.	Note	%±
2000	2,240		—
2010	2,326		3.8%
2020	2,159		−7.2%
2021 (est.)	2,141		−0.8%
U.S. Decennial Census

As of the census of 2000, there were 2,240 people, 856 households, and 647 families living in the township. The population density was 147.6 inhabitants per square mile (57.0/km^{2}). There were 914 housing units at an average density of 60.2 per square mile (23.2/km^{2}). The racial makeup of the township was 96.34% White, 2.81% African American, 0.04% Native American, 0.31% Asian, and 0.49% from two or more races. Hispanic or Latino of any race were 0.45% of the population.

There were 856 households, out of which 31.3% had children under the age of 18 living with them, 65.1% were married couples living together, 7.4% had a female householder with no husband present, and 24.4% were non-families. 19.3% of all households were made up of individuals, and 8.5% had someone living alone who was 65 years of age or older. The average household size was 2.62 and the average family size was 3.01.

In the township the population was spread out, with 22.9% under the age of 18, 9.0% from 18 to 24, 27.5% from 25 to 44, 27.0% from 45 to 64, and 13.7% who were 65 years of age or older. The median age was 40 years. For every 100 females there were 102.2 males. For every 100 females age 18 and over, there were 103.4 males.

The median income for a household in the township was $39,880, and the median income for a family was $46,855. Males had a median income of $37,083 versus $24,583 for females. The per capita income for the township was $18,344. About 4.5% of families and 6.4% of the population were below the poverty line, including 6.3% of those under age 18 and 5.2% of those age 65 or over.

== Notable people ==
- James Hawdon, sociologist and Director of the Center for Peace Studies and Violence Prevention at Virginia Tech
