= River mile =

Measurement of distance from river mouth

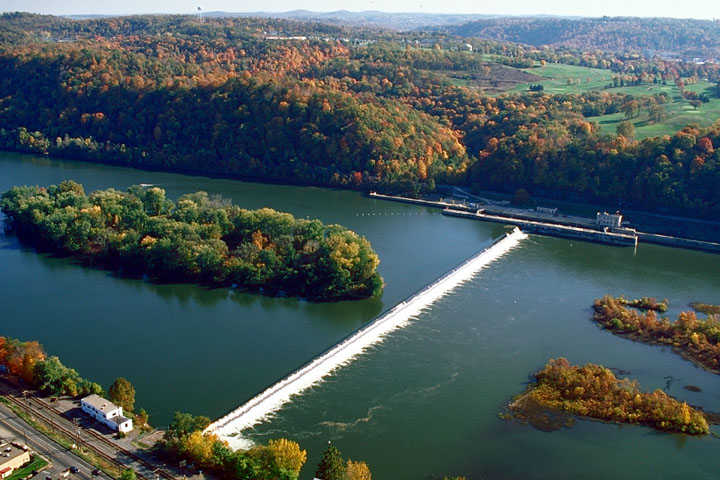
Part of Fourteen Mile Island in the Allegheny River - the island is named for its distance from the river's mouth in river miles.

A river mile is a measure of distance in miles along a river from its mouth. River mile numbers begin at zero and increase further upstream. The corresponding metric unit using kilometers is the river kilometer. They are analogous to vehicle roadway mile markers, except that river miles are rarely marked on the physical river; instead they are marked on navigation charts, and topographic maps. Riverfront properties are sometimes partially legally described by their river mile.

The river mile is not the same as the length of the river, rather it is a means of locating any feature along the river relative to its distance from the mouth, when measured along the course (or navigable channel) of the river.

River mile zero may not be exactly at the mouth. For example, the Willamette River (which discharges into the Columbia River) has its river mile zero at the edge of the navigable channel in the Columbia, some 900 feet (270 m) beyond the mouth. Also, the river mile zero for the Lower Mississippi River is located at Head of Passes, where the main stem of the Mississippi splits into three major branches before flowing into the Gulf of Mexico. Mileages are indicated as AHP (Above Head of Passes) or BHP (Below Head of Passes).

== Uses in the United States ==
River miles are used in a variety of ways. The Commonwealth of Pennsylvania, in its 2001 Pennsylvania Gazetteer of Streams, lists every named stream and every unnamed stream in a named geographic feature in the state, and gives the drainage basin area, mouth coordinates, and river mile, specifically the distance from the mouth of the tributary to the mouth of its parent stream. Some islands are named for their river mile distance, for example the Allegheny River in Pennsylvania has Six Mile Island, Nine Mile Island, Twelve Mile Island, and Fourteen Mile Island. (The last two islands form Allegheny Islands State Park, although Fourteen Mile Island was split into two parts by a dam).

The state of Ohio uses the "River Mile System of Ohio", which is "a method to reference locations on streams and rivers of Ohio". This work began by hand measurements on paper maps between 1972 and 1975 and has since been converted to a computer-based electronic version, which now covers the state in 787 river mile maps. Locations of facilities such as wastewater treatment plants and water quality measurement sites are referenced via river miles. Ohio uses one of two systems. The simplest is just the name of the river and the location in river miles. In cases where there is ambiguity, for example when more than one stream has the same name, it uses a series of river mile strings referring to the distance to the ocean along either the Ohio River (and Mississippi River) or through Lake Erie (and the Saint Lawrence Seaway).

Another example of a River Mile System is utilized by the U.S. Bureau of Reclamation, in New Mexico, on the Rio Grande. The river miles in Central New Mexico are measured from Caballo Dam upstream to near Embudo, New Mexico. For example, a river mile sign in the Albuquerque Bosque (part of Albuquerque's Open Space Park) is River Mile 184, approximately 184 miles above Caballo Dam. As mentioned earlier in this system the further you go up stream the higher the river mile number. This system is measured in 10ths of a mile.

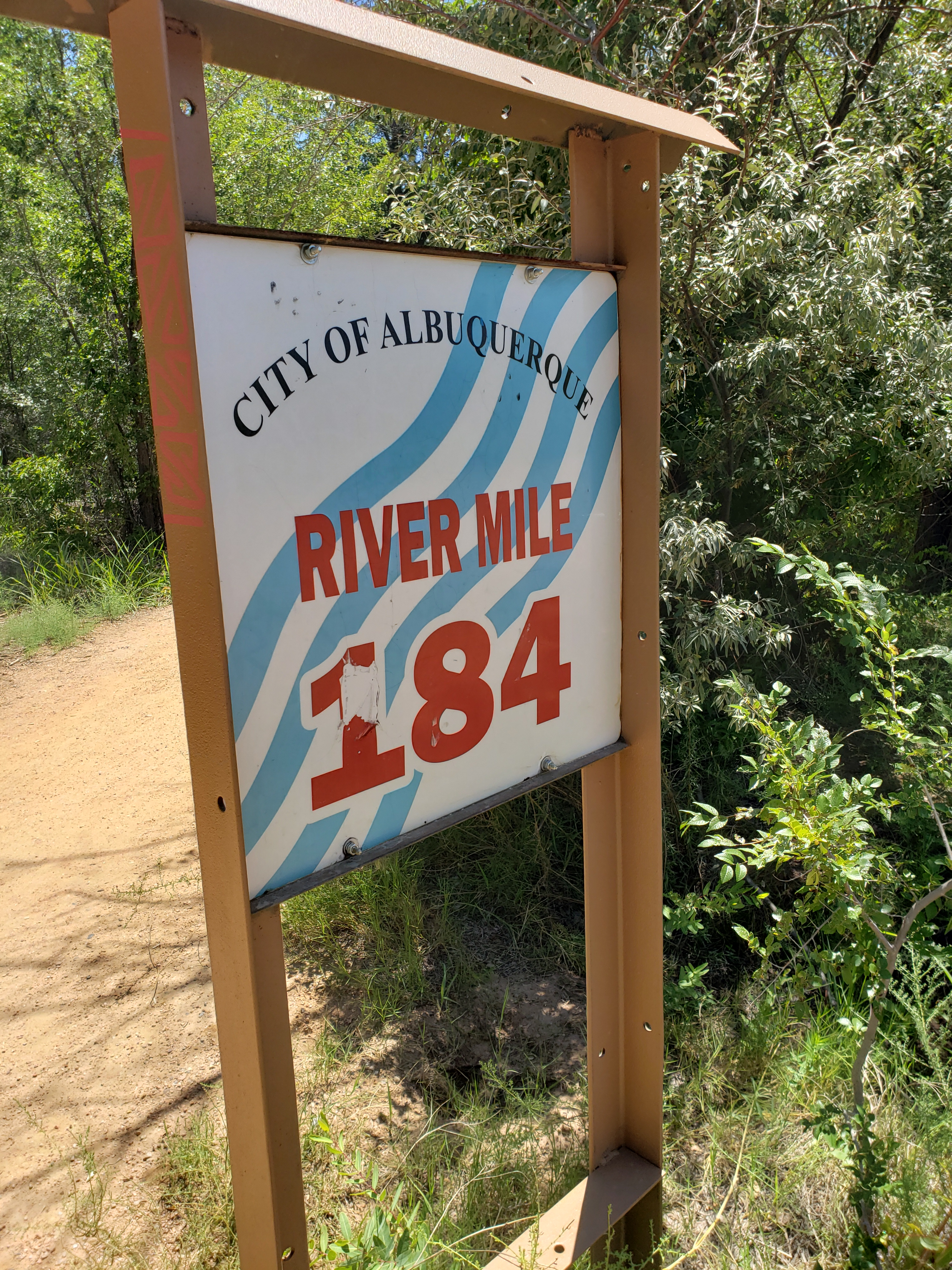
River Mile 184 sign in the Bosque along the Rio Grande in the Albuquerque Open Space

The U.S. Army Corps of Engineers uses river miles for its navigation maps.
