= Matt Morgan (disambiguation) =

Matt Morgan (born 1976) is an American actor, politician, former basketball player and retired professional wrestler.

Matt Morgan or Matthew Morgan may also refer to:

- Matt Morgan (cartoonist) (1837–1890), editorial cartoonist
- Matthew Morgan (politician) (1973— ), member of the Maryland House of Delegates
- Matt Morgan (comedian) (1977— ), English comedian
- Matt Morgan (American football) (1980— ), American football player
- Matthew Morgan (rugby union) (1992— ), Welsh rugby union footballer
- Matt Morgan (basketball) (1997— ), American basketball player
- Matthew Morgan (MP), member of parliament for Brecon
- Matthew Morgan (Dark Shadows), a fictional character from the Dark Shadows franchise
- Matt Morgan (Texas politician)
