= Harmar Township, Allegheny County, Pennsylvania =

Township in Pennsylvania, United States

Harmar Township, Pennsylvania
- Township
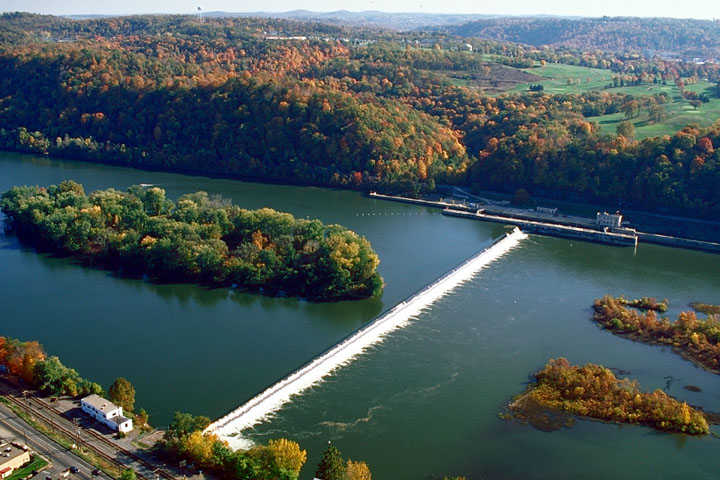
- Harmar Township is home to Allegheny Islands State Park and the C.W. Bill Young Lock and Dam in the Allegheny River.
- Motto: In God We Trust
- Interactive map of Harmar Township, Pennsylvania
- Location within Pennsylvania Location within the United States
- Coordinates: 40°32′24″N 79°50′2″W
- Country: United States
- State: Pennsylvania
- County: Allegheny
- Incorporated: 1875
- Founder: Harmar Denny
- Named for: Harmar Denny

Area
  - Total: 6.4 sq mi (17 km^{2})
  - Land: 6.0 sq mi (16 km^{2})
  - Water: 0.5 sq mi (1.3 km^{2})
- Elevation: 761 ft (232 m)

Population (2020)
  - Total: 3,136
  - Density: 520/sq mi (200/km^{2})
- Time zone: UTC-5 (Eastern (EST))
  - Summer (DST): UTC-4 (EDT)
- ZIP codes: 15238, 15049, 15024
- Area codes: 412 and 724
- School district: Allegheny Valley School District
- Website: www.harmartownship-pa.gov

Harmar Township is a township in Allegheny County, Pennsylvania, United States. It contains the communities of Acmetonia, Harmarville, Harmar Heights, and Chapel Downs. The population was 3,136 at the 2020 census. The township was named after Harmar Denny, a U.S. congressman and son of Ebenezer Denny.

== Geography ==
Harmar Township is located at 40°32′24″N 79°50′2″W. According to the United States Census Bureau, the township has a total area of 6.4 square miles (17 km^{2}), of which 6.0 square miles (16 km^{2}) is land and 0.5 square miles (1.3 km^{2}), or 7.45%, is water.

=== Streams ===
Harmar Township is entirely in the Allegheny River drainage basin and contains one undeveloped state park, Allegheny Islands State Park, on three alluvial islands in the Allegheny River.

Deer Creek flows through the township; it joins the Allegheny at Harmar.

=== Surrounding and adjacent neighborhoods ===
The township has six land borders, including Indiana Township to the north, Frazer Township to the northeast, Springdale Township and Cheswick to the east, O'Hara Township to the southwest and Fox Chapel to the west. Bordering the Allegheny River, Harmar runs adjacent with Oakmont to the south (with a direct link via Hulton Bridge) and Plum to the south and southeast.

== Government and politics ==
Presidential election results
Year	Republican	Democratic	Third parties
2020	53% 1,018	44% 855	1% 28
2016	55% 914	42% 693	4% 52
2012	54% 810	45% 671	1% 18

Historical population
Census	Pop.	Note	%±
1970	3,916		—
1980	3,461		−11.6%
1990	3,144		−9.2%
2000	3,242		3.1%
2010	2,921		−9.9%
2020	3,136		7.4%
2022 (est.)	3,060		−2.4%
U.S. Decennial Census

== Demographics ==
At the 2000 census there were 3,242 people, 1,522 households, and 882 families living in the township. The population density was 543.3 people per square mile (209.8 people/km^{2}). There were 1,637 housing units at an average density of 274.3 per square mile (105.9/km^{2}). The racial makeup of the township was 97.75% White, 0.68% African American, 0.09% Native American, 0.99% Asian, 0.06% from other races, and 0.43% from two or more races. Hispanic or Latino of any race were 0.56%.

There were 1,522 households, 19.8% had children under the age of 18 living with them, 45.7% were married couples living together, 9.1% had a female householder with no husband present, and 42.0% were non-families. 37.1% of households were made up of individuals, and 13.8% were one person aged 65 or older. The average household size was 2.09 and the average family size was 2.75.

The age distribution was 17.1% under the age of 18, 5.5% from 18 to 24, 28.0% from 25 to 44, 26.9% from 45 to 64, and 22.5% 65 or older. The median age was 45 years. For every 100 females, there were 89.9 males. For every 100 females age 18 and over, there were 87.4 males.

The median household income was $38,625 and the median family income was $50,054. Males had a median income of $35,731 versus $28,455 for females. The per capita income for the township was $24,486. About 6.3% of families and 6.6% of the population were below the poverty line, including 14.8% of those under age 18 and 4.7% of those age 65 or over.

== Communities ==
- Acmetonia
- Harmarville
- Harmar Heights
- Chapel Downs
