= Allegheny Islands State Park =

Park on three Allegheny River islands in Allegheny County, Pennsylvania

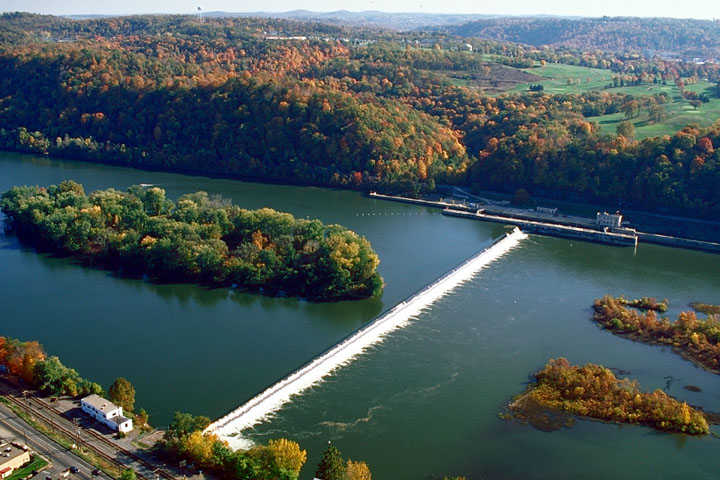
- C. W. Bill Young Lock and Dam spanning the Alleghany River at the eastern end of the park

- Location within Pennsylvania Location within the United States
- Interactive map of Allegheny Islands State Park
- Location: Allegheny County, Pennsylvania, United States
- Coordinates: 40°32′13″N 79°49′27″W
- Area: 50 acres (20 ha)
- Elevation: 735 feet (224 m)
- Established: 1980
- Administrator: Pennsylvania Department of Conservation and Natural Resources
- Website: Official website

Allegheny Islands State Park is a 50-acre (20 ha) Pennsylvania state park in Harmar Township, Allegheny County, Pennsylvania in the United States. The undeveloped park is composed of three alluvial islands located in the middle of the Allegheny River northeast of Pittsburgh. The islands are just north of the boroughs of Oakmont and Plum, and southwest of Cheswick. Bridges for the Pennsylvania Turnpike (Interstate 76) and the Bessemer and Lake Erie Railroad Branch of the Canadian National Railway cross the Allegheny River at the middle island.

== Islands ==
The park land on the islands has a total area of 43 acres (17 ha), with two islands downstream of the Allegheny River Lock and Dam Three (officially named the C. W. Bill Young Lock and Dam), and the other island upstream. Twelve Mile Island is the farthest downstream (west) and has a number of houses and buildings on the western four-fifths of the island (the park land is the eastern end). The remaining two islands are both uninhabited and have no structures on them. They were originally one island named Fourteen Mile Island, but were split into two parts by the construction of the dam. Today the name Fourteen Mile Island is given to the middle island, just downstream (west) of the dam, and it is the site of the highway and railroad bridges. According to the USGS GNIS, the last island (which was once part of Fourteen Mile Island) is unnamed (although it is still labeled "Fourteen Mile Island" on the U.S. Army Corps of Engineers navigation maps of the Allegheny River.) This unnamed island is the easternmost and the only one upstream of the dam. There are also five to seven shoals near the islands, which are occasionally exposed.

Twelve Mile Island and Fourteen Mile Island are named for their distances, 12 miles (19 km) and 14 miles (23 km), up the Allegheny River from the confluence of the Allegheny and Monongahela Rivers to form the Ohio River in downtown Pittsburgh. They are two of six alluvial islands in the Allegheny River near Pittsburgh (for comparison, near Pittsburgh the Ohio River has only three islands and the Monongahela River has none). "The large number of islands in the Allegheny is a reflection of the large amount of glacially-derived sediment that was moved by the river."

== Facilities ==
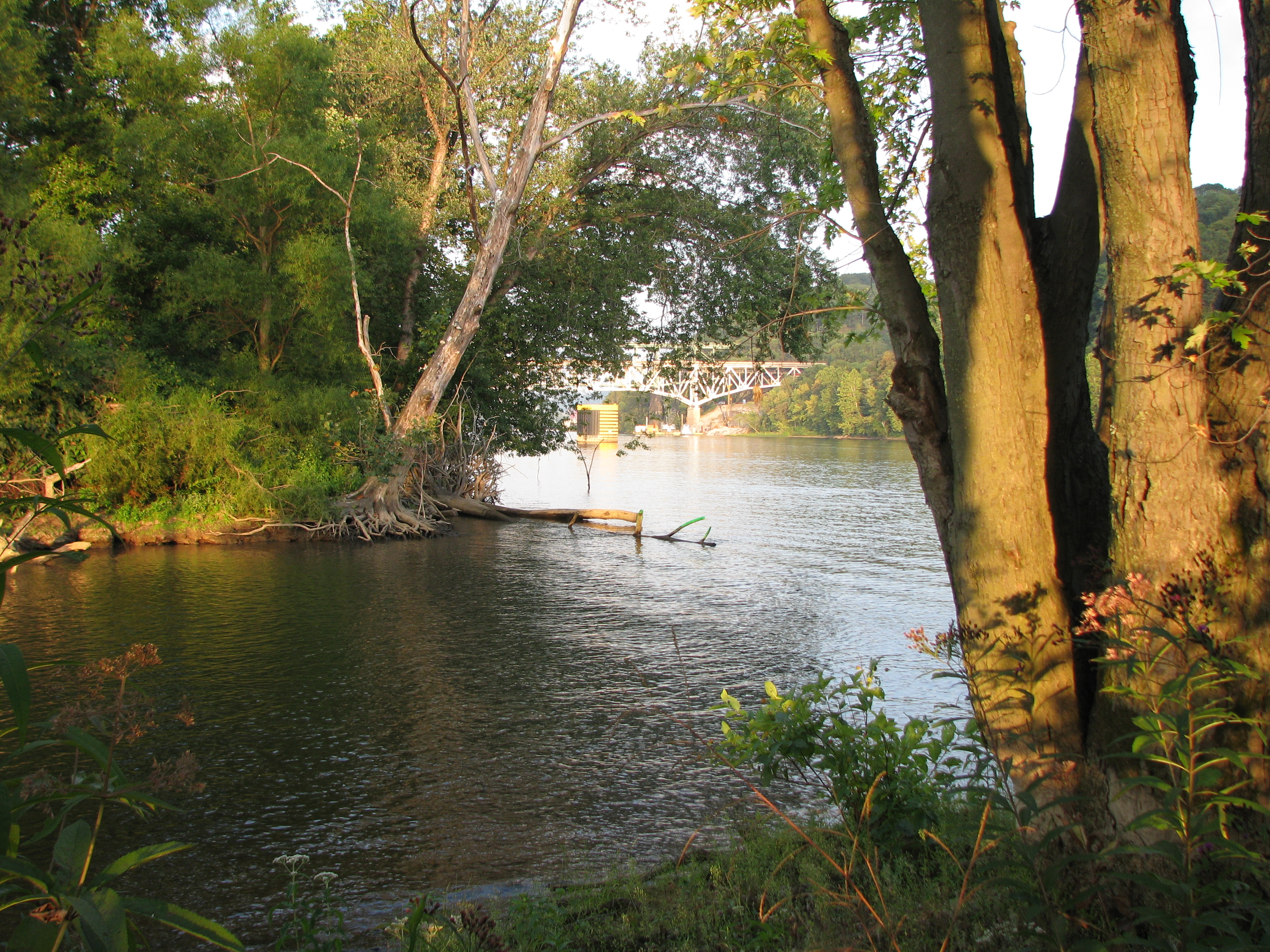
A view of the Allegheny River from an island in the park

Allegheny Islands State Park was established on December 31, 1980. As of 2007, it is undeveloped so that there are no facilities, and also no plans for future development. The park can only be accessed by boat. Camping is allowed on the islands and they are open for visits by groups such as the Boy Scouts and Venturing. Allegheny Islands State Park is administered from the Region 2 Office in Prospect, Pennsylvania.
