= Logans Ferry Mine Tunnel =

- Interactive map of Logans Ferry Mine Tunnel

Overview
- Location: Allegheny River between Plum and Springdale, Pennsylvania, United States
- Coordinates: 40.5450°N 79.7640°W

Operation
- Opened: 1921
- Character: formerly twin mine cart tunnels

Technical
- Length: 3,000 feet (910 m)

The Logans Ferry Mine Tunnel consists of a pair of abandoned coal tunnels under the Allegheny River between Plum and Springdale, Pennsylvania in the United States.

== History ==
In 1919, West Penn Power acquired the land to build a power facility in Springdale, but did not have an adequate coal source. As a result, they leased coal-rich land on the opposite shore of the river. To simplify transport issues, the decision was made to build the mine tunnel, which opened in 1921. By the 1940s, the mine's resources started to be depleted and West Penn, which had constructed the neighborhood of Logan Heights (which today looks unlike most of the 1960s-or-later suburban stock that dominates Plum), transformed from being a company town to a community of homeowners. In 1954, the mine transferred most of its operations 4 miles (6.4 km) east to Upper Burrell (the former mine site remains a somewhat rural bluff in the midst of suburbia), but continued to use the tunnel. However, in 1968, the mine was closed permanently, and the tunnels are presumed to be currently flooded.
