= Plum Borough School District =

School district in Pennsylvania, U.S.

Address
- 900 Elicker Road Plum, Allegheny County, Pennsylvania, 15239-1453; United States
- Coordinates: 40.49294°N 79.75120°W

District information
- Type: Public
- Motto: Exceptionally Prepared for Success
- Grades: K-12
- Established: 1940
- Superintendent: Dr. Rick Walsh
- Asst. superintendent(s): Dr. Ashley Boyers & Ms. Denise Sedlack
- Business administrator: Mr. Ryan Manzer
- School board: 9 Members
- Chair of the board: Angela Anderson
- Schools: 5

Students and staff
- Enrollment: 3,579
- Faculty: 511
- Teachers: 232
- Student–teacher ratio: 17:1
- District mascot: Mustang
- Colors: Purple and Gold

Other information
- Website: www.pbsd.net

The Plum Borough School District is a midsized, suburban public school district serving the Pittsburgh, Pennsylvania suburb of Plum. Plum Borough School District encompasses approximately 28 square miles (73 km^{2}). According to 2000 federal census data, it served a resident population of 26,940. By 2010, the district's population rose to 27,131 people. In 2009, the district residents' per capita income was $20,863, while the median family income was $52,807. In the Commonwealth, the median family income was $49,501 and the United States median family income was $49,445, in 2010. By 2013, the median household income in the United States rose to $52,100.

Plum Borough School District operates five schools, including, Plum High School (9th–12th), Plum Middle School (7th–8th), Holiday Park Intermediate School (5th-6th), and two elementary schools serving grades (K-4th): O'Block Elementary School and George Pivik Elementary School.

The Plum Borough School District is bordered by seven other school districts: Penn Hills School District, Gateway School District, Riverview School District, and Allegheny Valley School District (across the Allegheny River). The district is also bordered by three school districts in neighboring Westmoreland County: Franklin Regional School District, Burrell School District and New Kensington-Arnold School District.

== Extracurriculars ==
The students have access to a variety of clubs, activities and sports. Plum Borough School District's football classification is "AAAA" (Quad-A), which is the largest of the football classifications A, AA, AAA and AAAA. The district operates a chapter of the National Honor Society.

=== Athletics ===
The district is part of the WPIAL sports organization.

- Cheerleading
- Cross Country (CoEd)
- Football (7-12)
- Soccer (Boys and Girls)
- Tennis(Boys and girls)
- Basketball Varsity (Boys and Girls) and 9th grade teams
- Rifle (CoEd)
- Swimming and Diving (Boys and Girls)
- Wrestling
- Volleyball varsity and 9th grade teams
- Baseball varsity and 9th grade teams
- Softball
- Track and Field (Boys and Girls)

Club sports: Indoor track, Ice Hockey, Bowling and Crew
