= Deer Creek (Allegheny River tributary) =

Location
- Country: United States

Physical characteristics
- Source
  - coordinates: 40.6844444°N 79.9025°W
- Mouth
  - coordinates: 40.5353000°N 79.8394000°W
  - elevation: 725 ft (221 m)

Basin features
- River system: Allegheny River

Deer Creek is a tributary of the Allegheny River located in both Allegheny and Butler counties in the U.S. state of Pennsylvania.

== Course ==
Deer Creek joins the Allegheny River at the township of Harmar.

=== Tributaries ===
(Mouth at the Allegheny River)

- Little Deer Creek
- Long Run
- Rawlins Run
- Blue Run
- Cunningham Run
- Cedar Run
- Dawson Run
- West Branch Deer Creek

== See also ==
- Allegheny Islands State Park
- List of rivers of Pennsylvania
- List of tributaries of the Allegheny River
