= Harmarville, Pennsylvania =

Unincorporated community in Pennsylvania, US

- Unincorporated community
- Location within the U.S. state of Pennsylvania Harmarville (the United States)
- Coordinates: 40°32′5″N 79°51′8″W
- Country: United States
- State: Pennsylvania
- County: Allegheny
- Township: Harmar
- Time zone: UTC-5 (Eastern (EST))
  - Summer (DST): UTC-4 (EDT)

Harmarville is an unincorporated community located in Harmar Township, Allegheny County, Pennsylvania, United States.

== History ==
Harmarville was founded in 1875. Harmar Township was named after Harmar Denny, who served as a United States Congressman (1829–1837). He was the son of Ebenezer Denny, who served as an officer during the American Revolution.

Harmarville was settled by farmers and by immigrant coal miners who worked in the former Harmar Mine.

Because of the Allegheny River, the Pennsylvania Turnpike and other highways and railroads, Harmarville has a strong history as a transportation center. Early industries included brick manufacturing. Later, such endeavors as the Gulf Research Center and the Harmarville Rehabilitation Center were located here. Brick manufacturing is still active in nearby Indiana Township on Rich Hill Road.

Of historic interest are the company houses for the Harmar Mine, located at the lower end of Guy's Run Road and the Harmarville Presbyterian Church, built in 1804 on the Denny farm.

== Notable person ==
- Bill Young, member of the United States House of Representatives, from Florida, was born in Hamarville.
