= Harwick Mine disaster =

1904 mining accident in Cheswick, Pennsylvania

Coordinates: 40.558°N 79.803°W

The Harwick Mine disaster was a mining accident on January 25, 1904 in Cheswick, Pennsylvania, some sixteen mi (26 km) east of Pittsburgh in the western part of the state. The blast killed an estimated 179 miners and 2 aid workers. The disaster ranks among the ten worst coal mining disasters in American history. One community especially impacted was the Hungarian community in Homestead, Pennsylvania. Fifty-eight of the members of the First Hungarian Reformed Church of Homestead—a full third of the congregation—died in the explosion.

Coal was mined by compressed-air machine, blasted down with dynamite. Ice accumulation in the air shaft restricted ventilation which caused a buildup of methane gas. At 8:15 am, workers blasted down dynamite which ignited the methane. Coal dust suspended in the air assisted the explosion in traveling throughout every region of the mine. In addition to interior devastation, the force was so powerful that it wrecked the exterior of the shaft.

Of 175 mine workers underground at the time, the single survivor was the severely burned 16-year-old Adolph Gunia. Other casualties included Daniel A. Lyle and the mine engineer Selwyn M. Taylor, who both gave their lives in rescue attempts after responding to the scene. Greatly touched by Taylor's and Lyle's sacrifice, Andrew Carnegie had medals privately minted for their families, and within two months had established a $5 million Carnegie Hero Fund as a result.

The mine was owned by the Allegheny Coal Company.
