= Riddle Run =

Location
- Country: United States

Physical characteristics
- Source
  - coordinates: 40.5733333°N 79.7891667°W
- Mouth
  - coordinates: 40.5395119°N 79.7697702°W
  - elevation: 738 ft (225 m)

Basin features
- River system: Allegheny River

Riddle Run is a tributary of the Allegheny River located in Allegheny County in the U.S. state of Pennsylvania.

== Course ==
Riddle Run joins the Allegheny River at the borough of Springdale.

== See also ==
- List of rivers of Pennsylvania
- List of tributaries of the Allegheny River
- Rachel Carson was born and raised in Springdale.
