= Allegheny River Lock and Dam No. 4 =

- U.S. National Register of Historic Places
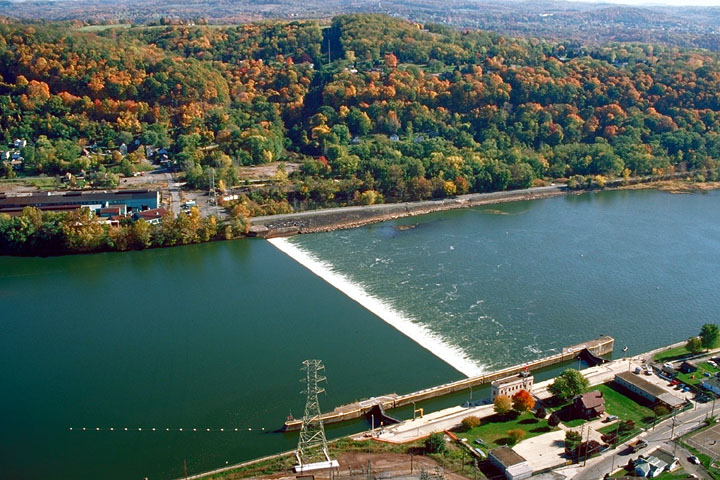

- Location within Pennsylvania Location within the United States
- Location: 1 River Avenue, Harrison Township, Allegheny County, Pennsylvania
- Coordinates: 40°36′52″N 79°42′59″W
- Built: 1927
- Architectural style: Moderne
- MPS: Allegheny River Navigation System MPS
- NRHP reference No.: 00000398
- Added to NRHP: April 21, 2000

The Allegheny River Lock and Dam No. 4 in Harrison Township, Allegheny County, Pennsylvania, is a lock that was built 1920-1927, and opened in 1927, 24.2 miles upstream from the mouth of the river in Pittsburgh. The lock and dam were built by the U.S. Army Corps of Engineers as a part of an extensive system of locks and dams to improve navigation along the Allegheny River.

It is located about 24.2 Miles up the Allegheny River from the Point in Downtown Pittsburgh. Also, it is about 6 Miles down the Allegheny from the mouth of the Kiskiminetas River.

Upriver, Allegheny Pool No. 4 has an average water elevation of 745.4 feet above sea level and extends about 6.2 miles upriver to Allegheny River Lock and Dam No. 5. Downriver, Allegheny Pool No. 3 has an average water elevation of 734.5 feet above sea level and extends about 9.7 miles downriver to Allegheny River Lock and Dam No. 3. Thus Lock No. 4 lifts and lowers boats about 10.9 feet between the pools.

It has a single lock and a fixed-crest dam, keeping the river depth at least 9 feet in the pool above the dam. The amount of water that flows over the dam is not controlled locally, so it does not provide flood control, but it does help provide water to municipalities.

Traffic through the lock was about 1.8 million tons in 1998, including shipments of coal, petroleum, sand and gravel, ore, steel, chemicals, fertilizer, salt, flour, lime, and slag.

It was listed on the National Register of Historic Places on April 21, 2000.
