= Springdale, Pennsylvania =

Borough in Pennsylvania, US

- Borough
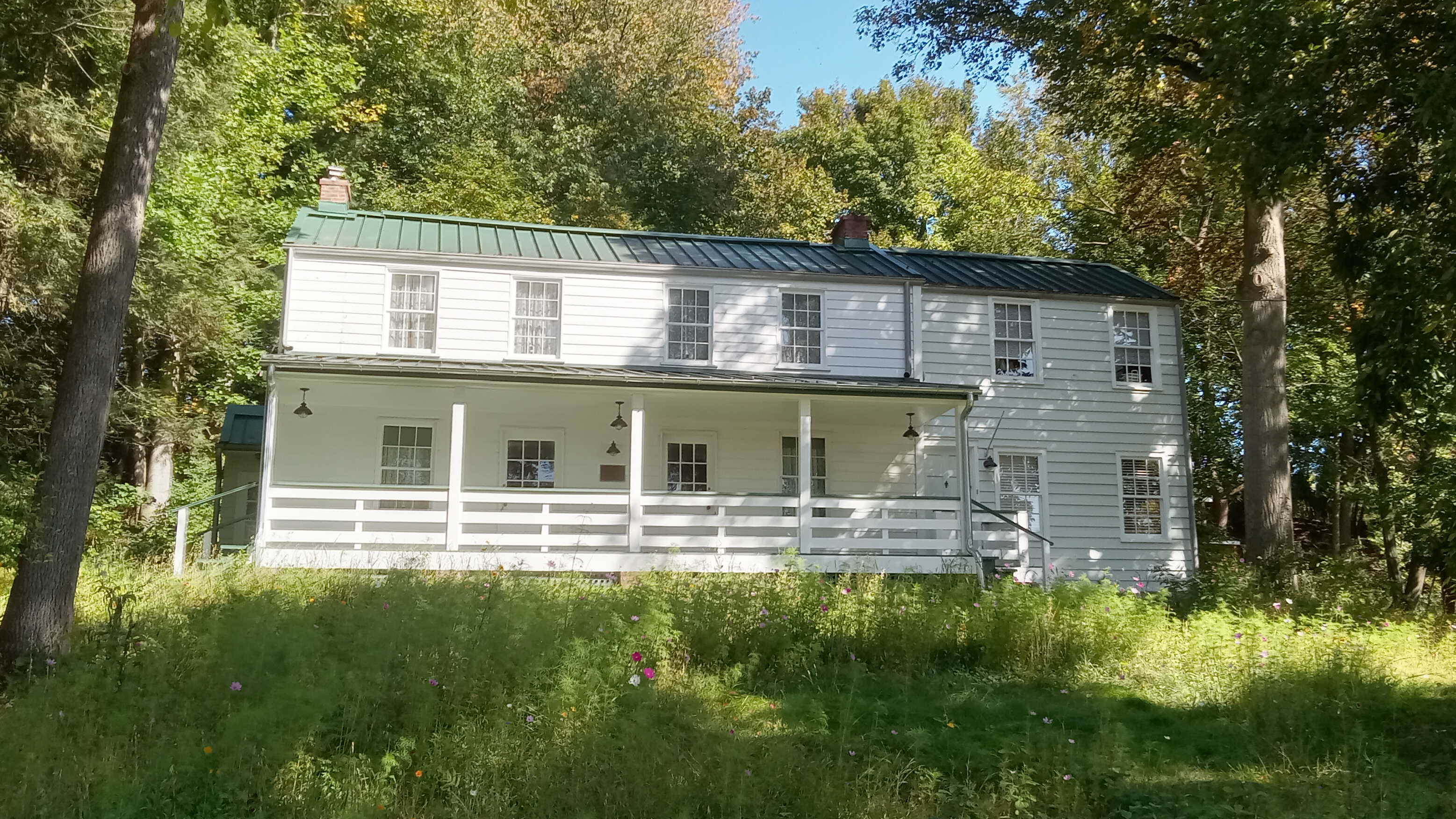
- Rachel Carson Homestead
- Nickname: Power City
- Location in Allegheny County and the U.S. state of Pennsylvania.

- Location within Pennsylvania Location within the United States
- Coordinates: 40°32′29″N 79°46′56″W
- Country: United States
- State: Pennsylvania
- County: Allegheny
- First settled: 1730
- Incorporated: Oct 17, 1906

Government
  - Mayor: Joel Anderson

Area
  - Total: 1.09 sq mi (2.83 km^{2})
  - Land: 0.93 sq mi (2.42 km^{2})
  - Water: 0.16 sq mi (0.42 km^{2})
- Elevation: 814 ft (248 m)

Population (2020)
  - Total: 3,400
  - Density: 3,641.7/sq mi (1,406.07/km^{2})
- Time zone: UTC-5 (Eastern (EST))
  - Summer (DST): UTC-4 (EDT)
- ZIP code: 15144
- Area code: 724
- FIPS code: 42-72960
- School district: Allegheny Valley
- Website: www.springdaleborough.com

Springdale is a borough in northeastern Allegheny County, Pennsylvania, United States, 18 miles (29 km) northeast of Pittsburgh along the Allegheny River. The population was 3,400 at the 2020 census. The borough became official in 1906, after breaking away from the township.

== History ==
Springdale Borough was incorporated in 1906, when it separated from Springdale Township. It was named after local natural springs and the surrounding small valley, or dale. The area was originally inhabited by Native American tribes, but soon colonized by European settlers. The town became a bustling railroad town and a hub for the coal industry in the late 1800s and the early 1900s. Springdale originally got its name in the year 1820 by either Hannah Keene or her daughter, Frances Keene. Before this, the town is believed to have been known as "Deertown." Today, Springdale is a quiet residential community with a small downtown area and many small businesses.

The first European settlers arrived in the area in the early 1800s. Among these settlers were familiar surnames such as Mellon, Henderson, Remaley, Shoop, Brackenridge, Denny, Pillow, Keene, Hanna, Coe, and Moyer. Several streets in Springdale today are named after these families.

== Geography ==
Springdale is located at 40°32′27″N 79°47′2″W (40.5409, -79.7839).

According to the U.S. Census Bureau, the borough has a total area of 1.1 square miles (2.8 km^{2}), of which 0.9 square miles (2.3 km^{2}), or 82.14%, is land, and 0.2 square miles (0.52 km^{2}), or 18.57%, is water.

=== Streams ===
The Riddle Run joins the Allegheny River at Springdale.

The Tawney Run (formerly Shoop's Run) flows between Springdale and Cheswick.

=== Surrounding and adjacent communities ===
Springdale has two land borders, including Springdale Township to the north and Cheswick to the west. Adjacent across the Allegheny River to the east and south is Plum.

== Demographics ==
Historical population
Census	Pop.	Note	%±
1880	456		—
1910	1,999		—
1920	2,929		46.5%
1930	4,781		63.2%
1940	4,989		4.4%
1950	4,939		−1.0%
1960	5,602		13.4%
1970	5,202		−7.1%
1980	4,418		−15.1%
1990	3,992		−9.6%
2000	3,828		−4.1%
2010	3,405		−11.1%
2020	3,400		−0.1%
U.S. Decennial Census

=== 2020 census ===
As of the 2020 census, Springdale had a population of 3,400. The median age was 45.1 years. 17.8% of residents were under the age of 18 and 20.5% of residents were 65 years of age or older. For every 100 females there were 94.5 males, and for every 100 females age 18 and over there were 91.2 males age 18 and over.

100.0% of residents lived in urban areas, while 0.0% lived in rural areas.

There were 1,608 households in Springdale, of which 21.5% had children under the age of 18 living in them. Of all households, 36.6% were married-couple households, 24.2% were households with a male householder and no spouse or partner present, and 32.2% were households with a female householder and no spouse or partner present. About 39.8% of all households were made up of individuals and 16.4% had someone living alone who was 65 years of age or older.

There were 1,738 housing units, of which 7.5% were vacant. The homeowner vacancy rate was 1.0% and the rental vacancy rate was 5.0%.

Racial composition as of the 2020 census
Race	Number	Percent
White	3,126	91.9%
Black or African American	50	1.5%
American Indian and Alaska Native	3	0.1%
Asian	2	0.1%
Native Hawaiian and Other Pacific Islander	0	0.0%
Some other race	35	1.0%
Two or more races	184	5.4%
Hispanic or Latino (of any race)	49	1.4%

=== 2000 census ===
As of the census of 2000, there were 3,828 people, 1,685 households, and 1,034 families residing in the borough. The population density was 4,104.2 inhabitants per square mile (1,584.6/km^{2}). There were 1,802 housing units at an average density of 1,932.0 per square mile (745.9/km^{2}). The racial makeup of the borough was 99.03% White, 0.29% African American, 0.08% Native American, 0.13% Asian, 0.18% from other races, and 0.29% from two or more races. Hispanic or Latino of any race were 0.21% of the population.

There were 1,685 households, out of which 25.8% had children under the age of 18 living with them, 46.2% were married couples living together, 11.9% had a female householder with no husband present, and 38.6% were non-families. 34.4% of all households were made up of individuals, and 16.5% had someone living alone who was 65 years of age or older. The average household size was 2.26 and the average family size was 2.93.

In the borough the population was spread out, with 21.9% under the age of 18, 6.0% from 18 to 24, 29.5% from 25 to 44, 22.2% from 45 to 64, and 20.5% who were 65 years of age or older. The median age was 41 years. For every 100 females, there were 89.0 males. For every 100 females age 18 and over, there were 86.7 males.

The median income for a household in the borough was $35,440, and the median income for a family was $43,476. Males had a median income of $36,711 versus $25,920 for females. The per capita income for the borough was $19,798. About 3.5% of families and 7.8% of the population were below the poverty line, including 10.2% of those under age 18 and 8.8% of those age 65 or over.

== Government and politics ==
Presidential election results
Year	Republican	Democratic	Third parties
2020	53% 1,002	45% 843	1% 23
2016	55% 834	44% 660	1% 22
2012	51% 767	48% 716	1% 24

== Museums and other points of interest ==
The Springdale Free Public Library serves the borough.

The Rachel Carson Homestead is located in Springdale on Marion Avenue.

Springdale is also notable for its proximity to a variety of industrial locations, including a local PPG plant (which celebrated its 75th anniversary in June 2022), and the formerly active Cheswick Generating Station, a coal-fired electric power plant known for its two large smokestacks which dominated the skyline for miles until their demolition on June 2, 2023.

== Education ==
The borough is within the Allegheny Valley School District, and is served by Springdale Jr-Sr High School. The former Colfax Upper Elementary School sits several blocks below the high school.

== Gallery ==
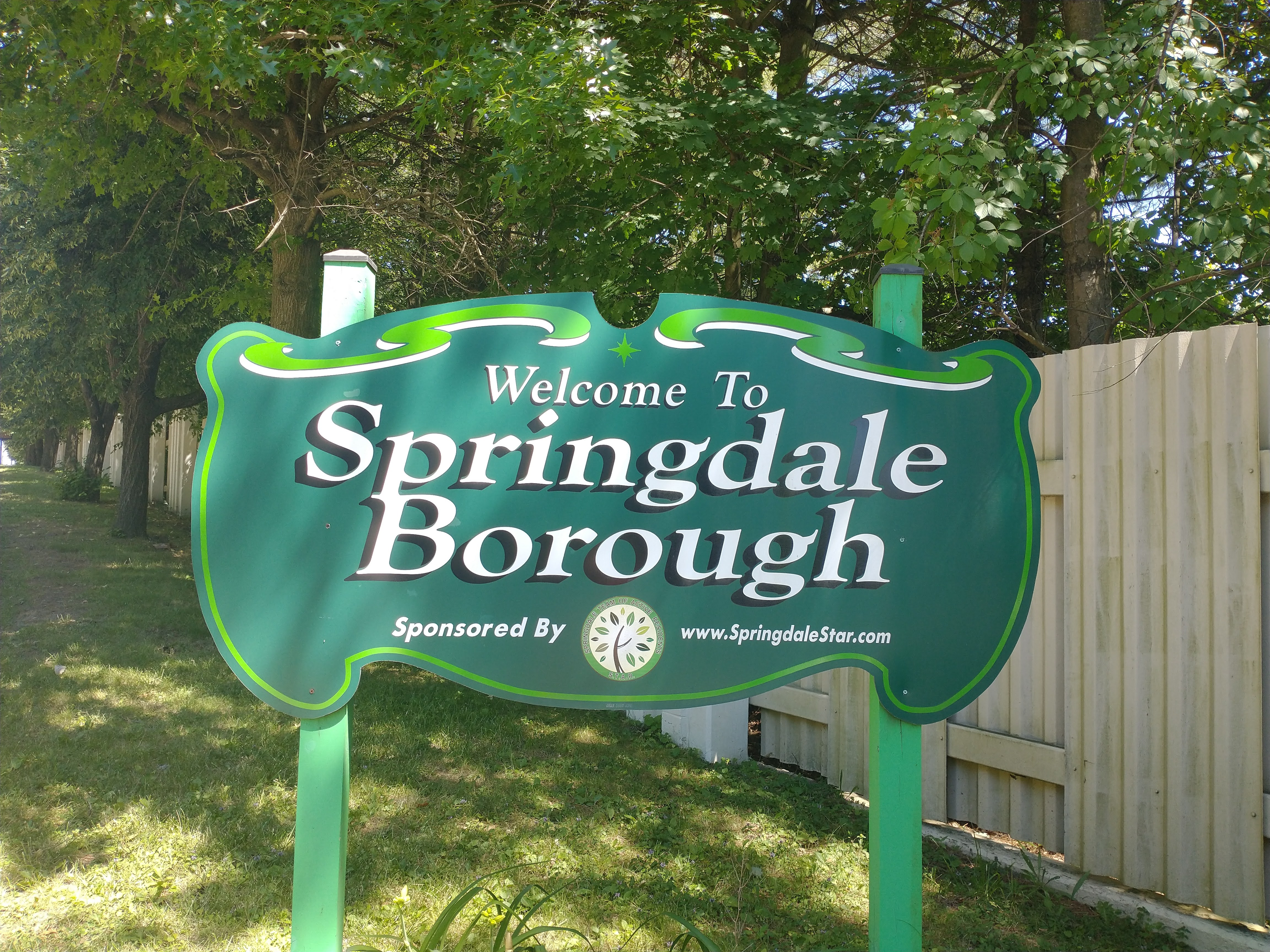
Springdale Welcome sign

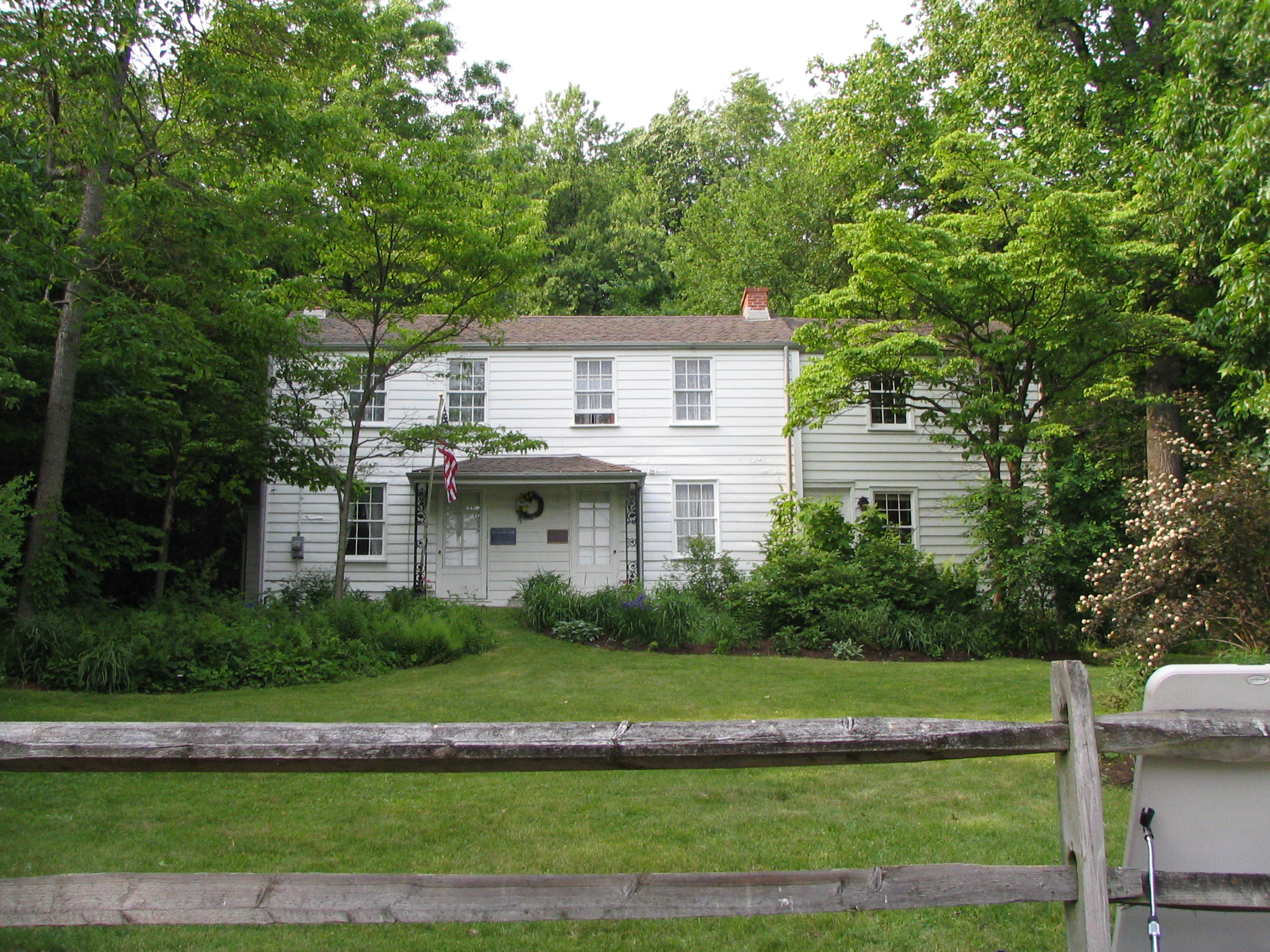
Rachel Carson Homestead in May 2007

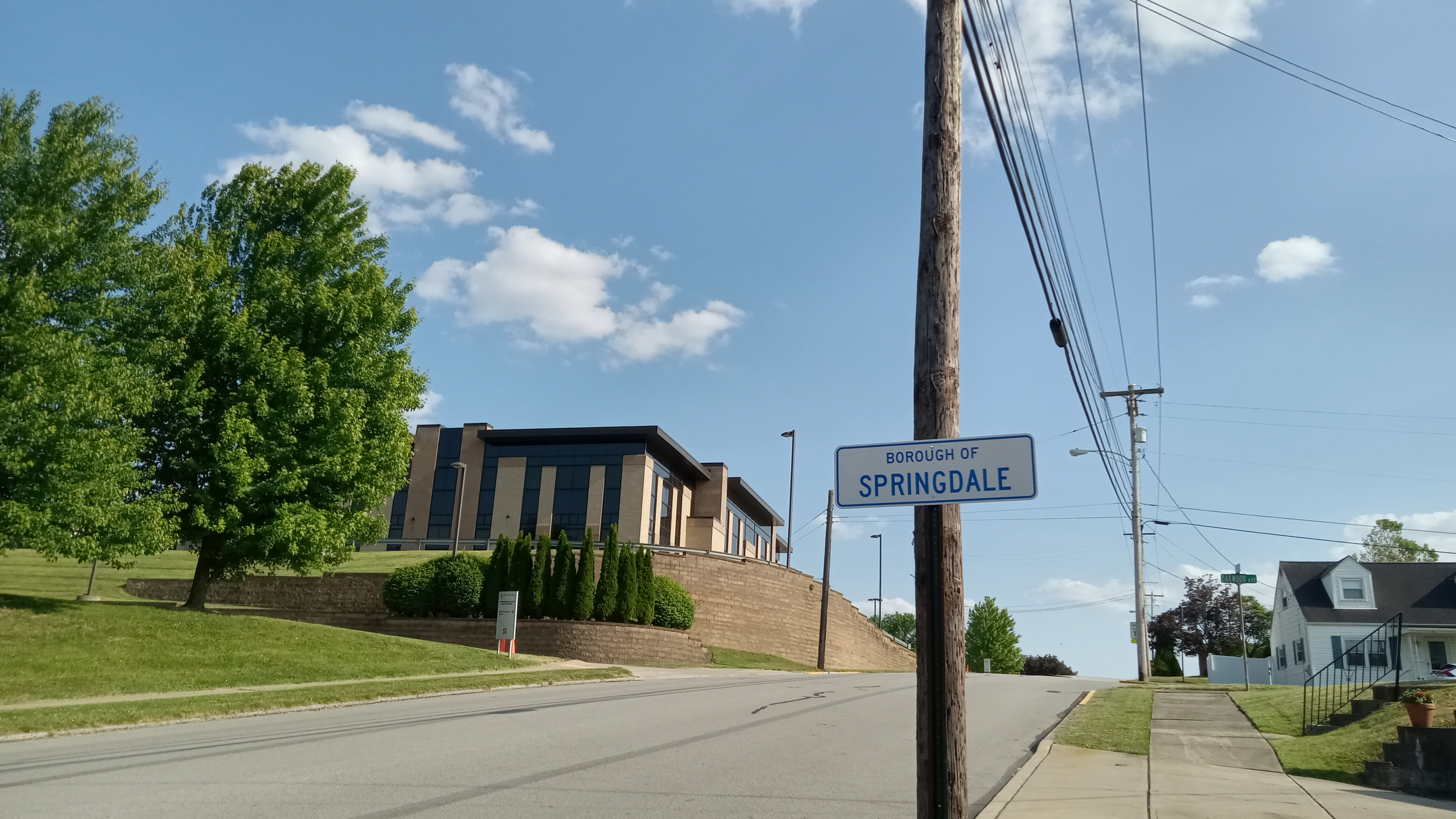
Uphill view of Springdale Jr-Sr High School

== Notable people ==
- Rachel Carson, former marine biologist and author of Silent Spring
- Tony Janiro, former professional boxer
- George E. Merrick, former real estate developer and founder of Coral Gables, Florida
- Conrad Susa, former opera composer

== See also ==
- List of crossings of the Allegheny River (coal mine tunnels)
- Logans Ferry Mine Tunnel
