= Allegheny River Lock and Dam No. 3 =

- C.W. Bill Young Lock and Dam
- U.S. National Register of Historic Places
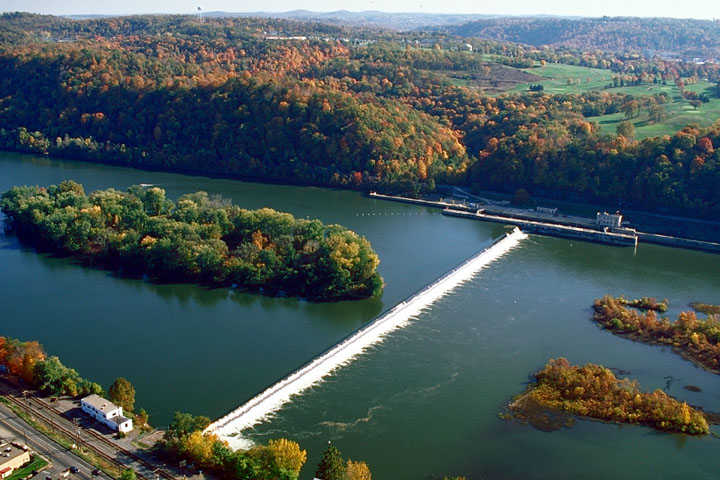

- Location within Pennsylvania Location within the United States
- Location: Approximately 1 mile (1.6 km) north of Barrington, Harmar Township, Allegheny County, Pennsylvania and Plum, Pennsylvania
- Coordinates: 40°32′18″N 79°48′13″W
- Built: 1932
- Architect: Vang Construction Company, Seeds & Derham
- MPS: Allegheny River Navigation System MPS
- NRHP reference No.: 00000397
- Added to NRHP: April 21, 2000

C.W. Bill Young Lock and Dam (formerly known as Allegheny River Lock and Dam No. 3) in Harmar Township, Allegheny County, Pennsylvania, and Plum, Pennsylvania, is a lock that was built in 1932. The lock and fixed-crest dam were built by the U.S. Army Corps of Engineers as a part of an extensive system of locks and dams to improve navigation along the Allegheny River.

C.W. Bill Young Lock and Dam is located about 14.5 Miles up the Allegheny River from the Point in Downtown Pittsburgh. Upriver, the pool has an average water elevation of 734.5 feet above sea level and extends about 9.7 miles upriver to Allegheny River Lock and Dam No. 4. Downriver, Allegheny Pool No. 2 has an average water elevation of 721 feet above sea level and extends about 7.8 miles downriver to Allegheny River Lock and Dam No. 2. Thus Lock No. 3 lifts and lowers boats about 13.5 feet between the pools.

The site has six contributing structures, the dam, the lock, an esplanade, the operations building, a gauging station, and a lockkeepers house.

Two 2-story frame lockkeepers houses for the former lock and dam structures were constructed about 1907, with the older house at 301 Barking Road surviving.

The site was listed on the National Register of Historic Places on April 21, 2000.
