= Alex Kirilloff =

American baseball player (born 1997)

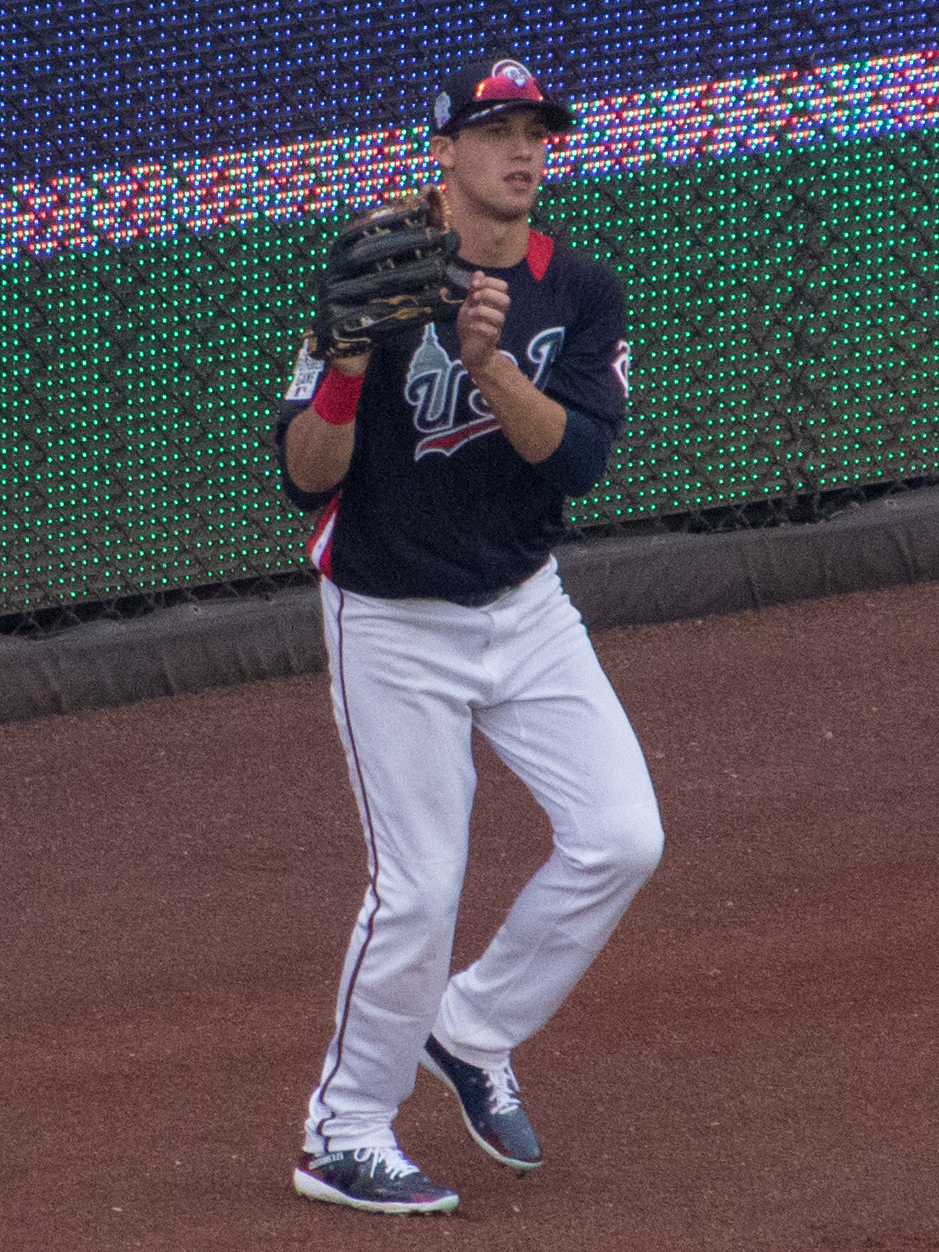
- Kirilloff in the 2018 All-Star Futures Game
- First baseman / Outfielder
- Born: November 9, 1997 (age 28); Pittsburgh, Pennsylvania, U.S.
- Batted: Left Threw: Left

MLB debut
- September 30, 2020, for the Minnesota Twins

Last MLB appearance
- June 11, 2024, for the Minnesota Twins

MLB statistics
- Batting average: .248
- Home runs: 27
- Runs batted in: 116
- Stats at Baseball Reference

Teams
- Minnesota Twins (2020–2024)

Alexander David Kirilloff (born November 9, 1997) is an American former professional baseball first baseman and outfielder. He played for the Minnesota Twins of Major League Baseball (MLB) from 2020 to 2024.

== Amateur career ==
Kirilloff played baseball at Plum High School in Plum, Pennsylvania, but did not attend classes there. He is a 2016 graduate of the Pennsylvania Cyber Charter School, which is an online public charter school based out of Midland, Pennsylvania. He played the outfield, first base, and was a pitcher. In only 24 games with Plum High School, Kirilloff batted .563 with 28 runs batted in (RBIs) and four home runs. As a pitcher, he had an 8–0 win–loss record with a 0.74 earned run average (ERA). During the summer of 2015 he played in the Perfect Game All-American Classic at Petco Park and won the event's home run derby. Kirilloff committed to Liberty University to play college baseball, but ultimately ended up choosing to begin his professional baseball career.

== Professional career ==
The Minnesota Twins selected Kirilloff in the first round, with the 15th overall pick, in the 2016 MLB draft. Kirilloff spent his first professional season with the Elizabethton Twins where he hit .306/.341/.454 with seven home runs, nine doubles, and 33 RBI in 55 games, which earned him Appalachian League MVP honors. His season was cut short with a partial ligament tear in his elbow, and he tried to avoid surgery, receiving platelet-rich plasma therapy. It was eventually deemed necessary that Kirilloff undergo Tommy John surgery, forcing him to miss all of 2017. He returned in 2018 with the Cedar Rapids Kernels before being promoted to the Fort Myers Miracle in June. In 130 games between the two clubs, he slashed .348/.392/.578 with 20 home runs and 101 RBI.

Kirilloff began 2019 with the Pensacola Blue Wahoos on the injured list with a wrist injury. For the season, he played in 94 games, slashing .283/.343/.413 with nine home runs and 43 RBI. He was selected to play in the Arizona Fall League for the Salt River Rafters following the season.

The Twins selected Kirilloff's contract on September 29, 2020, ahead of the 2020 American League Wild Card Series against the Houston Astros. He made his major league debut the next day as the starting rightfielder, going 1-for-4 with a single as the Twins were eliminated.

On July 21, 2021, it was announced that Kirilloff would undergo season-ending surgery to repair a torn ligament in his right wrist. On the season, he played in 59 games, hitting .251/.299/.423 with 8 home runs and 34 RBI. In 2022, Kirilloff appeared in 45 games for the Twins, batting .250/.290/.361 with 3 home runs and 21 RBI. On August 7, 2022, Kirilloff underwent season-ending ulnar shortening surgery on his right wrist.

In 2023, Kirilloff played in 88 games for Minnesota, hitting .270/.348/.445 with career–highs in home runs (11) and RBI (41). Following the season on October 24, 2023, he underwent surgery to repair a torn labrum in his right shoulder.

Kirilloff began the 2024 campaign with Minnesota, batting .201 with five home runs and 20 RBI across 57 games. He was placed on the injured list with back soreness and nerve issues on June 18, and was transferred to the 60–day injured list on July 30.

On October 31, 2024, Kirilloff announced his retirement from professional baseball on social media, citing a decrease in passion for the game and his struggles with injury as reasons for his departure.

== Personal life ==
Kirilloff and his wife, Jordan, had their first child, a daughter, in February 2020. Their second daughter was born in late 2021.
