= Allegheny River Lock and Dam No. 2 =

- U.S. National Register of Historic Places
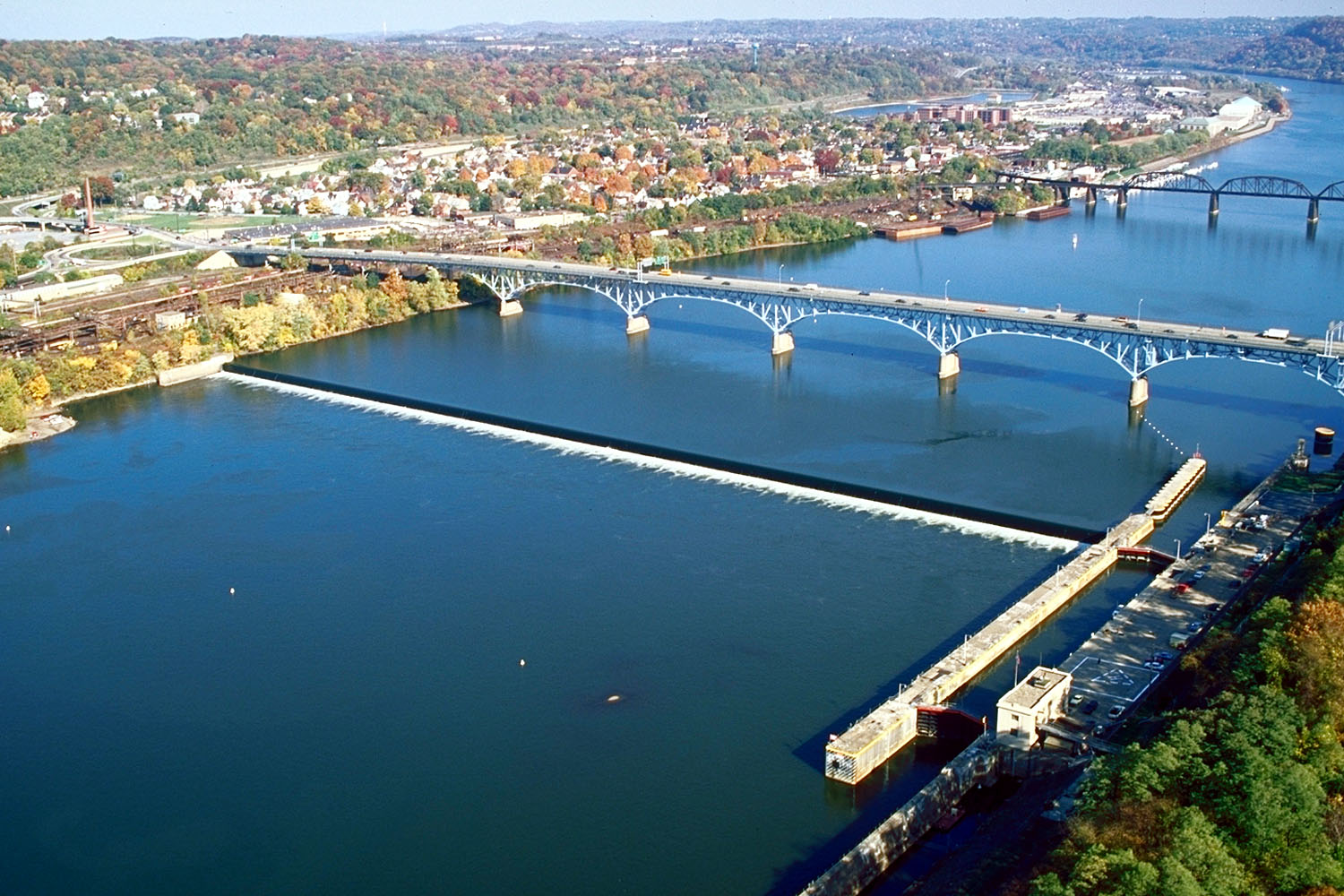

- Location within Pittsburgh Location within Pennsylvania Location within the United States
- Location: 7451 Lockway W, Pittsburgh, Pennsylvania
- Coordinates: 40°29′24″N 79°54′51″W
- Area: 8.8 acres (3.6 ha)
- Built: 1932
- Architect: Vang Construction Company
- MPS: Allegheny River Navigation System MPS
- NRHP reference No.: 00000396
- Added to NRHP: April 21, 2000

The Allegheny River Lock and Dam No. 2 (also known as the Highland Park Lock and Dam) in Pittsburgh, Pennsylvania is a lock and fixed-crest dam from 1932. It crosses the Allegheny River between the Pittsburgh neighborhood of Highland Park and the suburb of Aspinwall. The lock and dam were built by the U.S. Army Corps of Engineers as a part of an extensive system of locks and dams to improve navigation along the Allegheny River. It is the most-used lock operated by the United States Army Corps of Engineers.

Lock and Dam No. 2 is located about 6.7 Miles up the Allegheny River from the Point in Downtown Pittsburgh. Upriver from the dam, Allegheny Pool No. 2 has an average water elevation of 721 feet above sea level and extends about 7.8 miles upriver to Allegheny River Lock and Dam No. 3. Downriver is the Pittsburgh Pool with an average water elevation of 710 feet above sea level. Thus Lock No. 2 lifts and lowers boats about 11 feet between the pools.

The Pittsburgh Pool encompasses over 24 Miles of navigable water at about 710 feet of elevation. It stretches about 6.2 Miles up the Ohio River from the Emsworth Locks and Dam, 11.2 Miles up the Monongahela River to the Braddock Locks & Dam, and 6.7 Miles up the Allegheny.

The Highland Park Bridge crosses the river just above the dam. It was listed on the National Register of Historic Places in 2000.
