= Matt Morgan (American football) =

American football player and coach (born 1980)

No. 71
- Position: Offensive tackle

Personal information
- Born: December 3, 1980 (age 45); Pittsburgh, Pennsylvania, U.S.
- Listed height: 6 ft 7 in (2.01 m)
- Listed weight: 280 lb (127 kg)

Career information
- High school: Plum (Pittsburgh)
- College: Pittsburgh
- NFL draft: 2004: undrafted

Career history

Playing
- St. Louis Rams (2004–2005); Buffalo Bills (2006)

Coaching
- Penn Hills (PA) (2008–2009) Assistant coach; Monroeville (PA) Gateway (2010–2012) Assistant coach; Plum (PA) (2013–present) Head coach
- Stats at Pro Football Reference

Matthew Joseph Morgan (born December 3, 1980) is an American former professional football player who was an offensive tackle for the St. Louis Rams and Buffalo Bills of the National Football League (NFL). He played college football for the Pittsburgh Panthers.

Morgan went into coaching, and was assistant coach at Penn Hills High School for two seasons and at Gateway High School for three seasons, before taking the head coaching job at Plum High School in 2013. The 2020 Plum football team finished the regular season undefeated and Greater Allegheny Conference champions, capturing their first conference title in four decades. During the 2021 season, Plum was forced to forfeit a game for playing an ineligible player on several occasions.
