= Cheswick, Pennsylvania =

Borough in Pennsylvania, US

- Borough
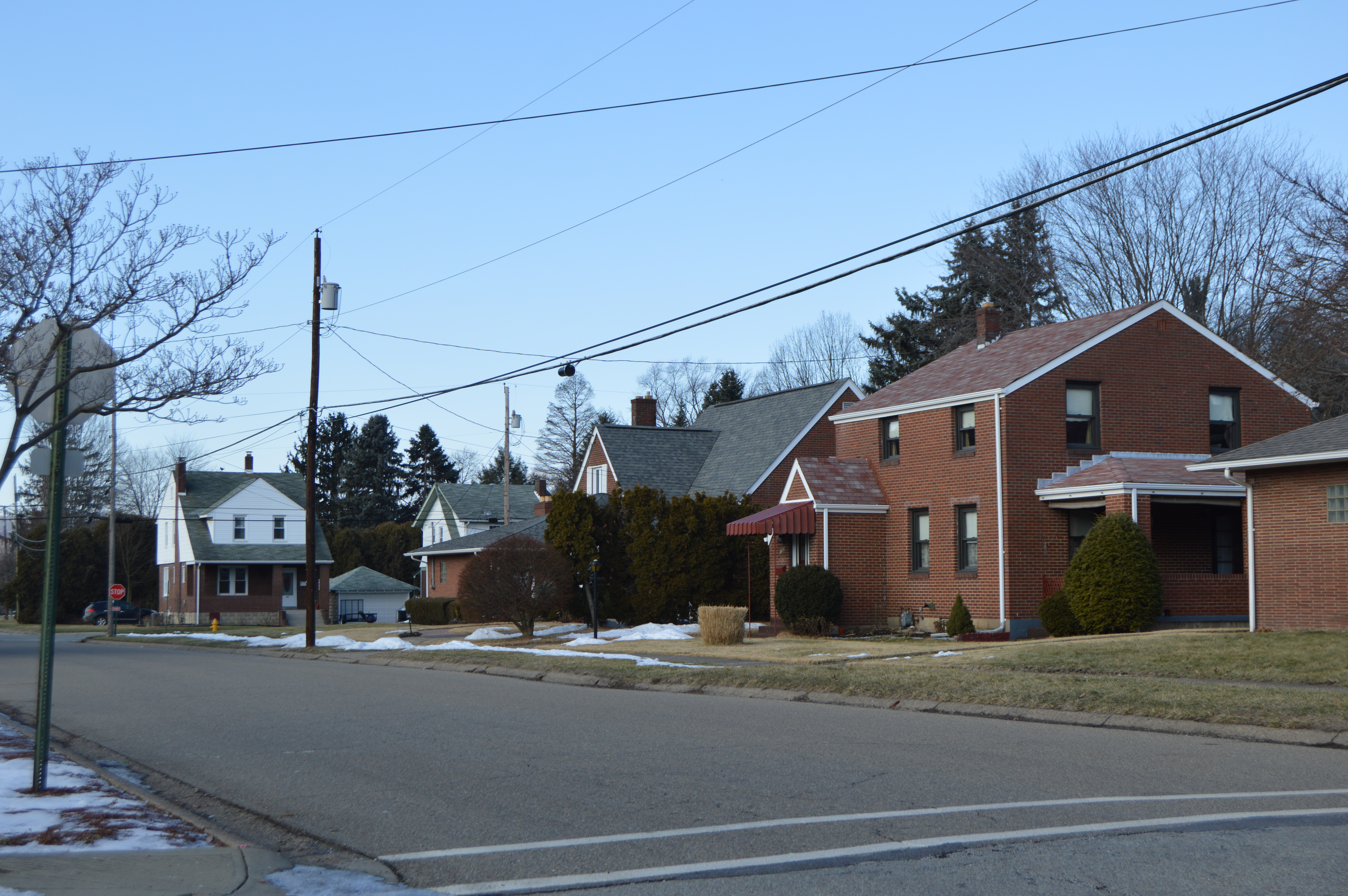
- Houses on Spruce Street
- Motto: A Community of Homes
- Interactive map of Cheswick, Pennsylvania
- Location within Pennsylvania Location within the United States
- Coordinates: 40°32′30″N 79°48′1″W
- Country: United States
- State: Pennsylvania
- County: Allegheny
- Incorporated: Mar 4, 1902

Area
  - Total: 0.55 sq mi (1.42 km^{2})
  - Land: 0.46 sq mi (1.20 km^{2})
  - Water: 0.085 sq mi (0.22 km^{2})

Population (2020)
  - Total: 1,672
  - Density: 3,614/sq mi (1,395.2/km^{2})
- Time zone: UTC-5 (Eastern (EST))
  - Summer (DST): UTC-4 (EDT)
- ZIP code: 15024
- Area code: 724
- FIPS code: 42-13392
- Website: http://www.cheswick.us/

Cheswick is a borough in Allegheny County, Pennsylvania, United States, along the Allegheny River. The population was 1,672 as of the 2020 census. Cheswick Borough was incorporated in 1902. It is a residential suburb of the Pittsburgh metropolitan area.

== History ==
Cheswick, named for a town in England, is a small town of about 350 acres (1,400,000 m^{2}). The history of the lands of Cheswick seems to have belonged to the Keen family at least in part, for Archie Pillow, or Pillar, as spelled in old records, inherited land from the Keen family. That land, in part, is where Cheswick is today. Archie's brother, George, once owned the second oldest house in the community. Thomas Pillow owned the land from Highland Avenue to the Harmar Township line.

The level land near the Allegheny River was used as farmland (Borland farm). Borland & Truck farms sold vegetables to Pittsburgh in the days of the canal. Barges and rafts of lumber were floated down the river to the steel mills. The men were fed by women who took baked goods out to the slow-moving barges in boats. In the days of the canal, wealthy families built great Victorian houses along the canal. Later, when the railroad bought out the right of way, the noise and dust became disturbing and many houses became run down and neglected.

Among the early names are Borland, Pillows, Macleans, Wilsons, Stewarts, Lemons, Albertsons, Buntings, Cummings, Shoops and Armstrongs. The Armstrong family lived in Acmetonia until after the Civil War. One built the fine stone house next to the Cheswick Theater (which has since been demolished), and he served as postmaster in the borough.

Before the days of the railroad, a tavern was located where the former station would later be built. People traveling to Pittsburgh by carriage probably stopped for refreshment. The road between Pittsburgh and Freeport was filled by farmers driving cattle to market in Pittsburgh, peddler wagons taking goods to country housewives, businessmen going to Pittsburgh, and officials going to court for the day. When the Pennsylvania Railroad was completed, the land was divided and sold in sections and lots. For a time, few were sold and growth was slow. The town name became Lincoln but had to be changed, for there were other communities by the same name. It was not until 1902 that the name Cheswick was adopted at the first council meeting. The streets were named for trees, such as Beech, Pine and Spruce. The President of the council was H. J. Hutchinson. The second ordinance dealt with the public health of the community. Houses, sewage, garbage, slaughterhouses were considered and fines stated. Later ordinances provided for paved streets and sidewalks.

One of the first industries was the Penwick Distillery. In a large brick building, the liquor was stored for years before it was sold. Several small factories were built, but coal, river sand and gravel were the most important. Many of the residents traveled by train each day to work in offices and stores. The Cheswick Fire Department was founded in the early 1900s.

In early times, the children went to school near Deer Creek in Harmar Township. Later, a school was built on Pittsburgh Road not far from the site of the old Cheswick elementary school. The borough council met in the school building at that time, and all of its papers were kept there. In 1919, fire destroyed the interior of the old school, burning most of the records of the young borough of Cheswick. A newer and bigger Cheswick School was planned under the Allegheny Valley Joint Schools expansion program. Today, the old elementary school is part of the Cheswick Christian Academy.

The Presbyterian Church was originally part of the old church built in 1804 on the Denny farm. Around 1873, Mathew Maclean donated land for the Presbyterian Church, and it was built at a cost of $2,441.01 with a membership of seventeen. The Reverend James Boyd was an early minister of the Presbyterian faith who served the community.

One of the worst mining disasters in American history occurred at the Harwick Mine disaster in Cheswick on January 25, 1904. It killed an estimated 181 men.

== Geography ==
Cheswick is located at 40.5417° N, 79.7992° W. Cheswick has three land borders, including Harmar Township to the west, Springdale Township to the north, and Springdale Borough to the east. Adjacent to Cheswick across the Allegheny River to the south is Plum.

According to the United States Census Bureau, the borough has a total area of 0.6 square miles (1.6 km^{2}), of which 0.5 square miles (1.3 km^{2}) is land and 0.1 square miles (0.26 km^{2}), or 15.79%, is water.

== Demographics ==
Presidential elections results
| Year | Republican | Democratic | Third parties |
|---|---|---|---|
| 2020 | 53% 612 | 45% 517 | 0.7% 9 |
| 2016 | 54% 531 | 43% 417 | 3% 30 |
| 2012 | 53% 503 | 46% 429 | 1% 9 |

Historical population
| Census | Pop. | Note | %± |
|---|---|---|---|
| 1910 | 317 | | — |
| 1920 | 471 | | 48.6% |
| 1930 | 1,053 | | 123.6% |
| 1940 | 1,241 | | 17.9% |
| 1950 | 1,534 | | 23.6% |
| 1960 | 2,734 | | 78.2% |
| 1970 | 2,563 | | −6.3% |
| 1980 | 2,336 | | −8.9% |
| 1990 | 1,971 | | −15.6% |
| 2000 | 1,899 | | −3.7% |
| 2010 | 1,746 | | −8.1% |
| 2020 | 1,672 | | −4.2% |

As of the 2000 census, there were 1,899 people, 853 households, and 590 families residing in the borough. The population density was 3,962.5 inhabitants per square mile (1,529.9/km^{2}). There were 887 housing units at an average density of 1,850.8 units per square mile (714.6 units/km^{2}). The racial makeup of the borough was 99.47% White, 0.26% African American, 0.05% Native American and 0.21% Asian. Hispanic or Latino of any race were 0.47% of the population.

There were 853 households, out of which 21.7% had children under the age of 18 living with them, 56.0% were married couples living together, 9.6% had a female householder with no husband present, and 30.8% were non-families. 28.4% of all households were made up of individuals, and 17.2% had someone living alone who was 65 years of age or older. The average household size was 2.22 and the average family size was 2.71.

In the borough the population was spread out, with 17.0% under the age of 18, 4.7% from 18 to 24, 24.8% from 25 to 44, 26.5% from 45 to 64, and 27.0% who were 65 years of age or older. The median age was 47 years. For every 100 females there were 84.0 males. For every 100 females age 18 and over, there were 82.0 males.

The median income for a household in the borough was $40,625, and the median income for a family was $47,019. Males had a median income of $37,188 versus $30,000 for females. The per capita income for the borough was $22,982. About 2.8% of families and 3.7% of the population were below the poverty line, including none of those under age 18 and 9.5% of those age 65 or over.

== Education ==
Cheswick is within the Allegheny Valley School District, and is also served by the Cheswick Christian Academy.
