= Allegheny Valley School District =

Public school district in Allegheny County, Pennsylvania, US

- Map of Allegheny County school districts

Address
- 300 Pearl Avenue Cheswick, Allegheny County, Pennsylvania, 15024; United States
- Coordinates: 40°32′43″N 79°49′03″W

District information
- Type: Public
- Motto: EmPOWERing Every Student
- Grades: K-12
- Established: 1965
- Superintendent: Dr. Patrick Graczyk

Students and staff
- Students: 919
- District mascot: Reddy Kilowatt
- Colors: Black and orange

Other information
- Website: www.avsdweb.org

The Allegheny Valley School District is a small, suburban K-12 public school district located in Allegheny County, Pennsylvania. The district is 15 miles (24 km) northeast of Pittsburgh. The Allegheny Valley School District serves Cheswick and Springdale boroughs and Harmar and Springdale townships in Allegheny County, Pennsylvania. The district encompasses approximately 10 square miles (26 km^{2}). According to 2000 federal census data, it serves a resident population of 10,771 people. In 2009, the district residents’ per capita income was $22,071, while the median family income was $45,562. In the Commonwealth, the median family income was $49,501 and the United States median family income was $49,445, in 2010.

== Schools ==
- Acmetonia Elementary School (grades K–6)
- Springdale Junior-Senior High School (grades 7–12)

=== Acmetonia Elementary School ===
Acmetonia Elementary School is a public elementary school located at 300 Pearl Avenue, Cheswick, Pennsylvania. The school is part of the Allegheny Valley School District and serves grades K-6.

=== Springdale Jr-Sr High School ===
Springdale Jr-Sr High School

Location
- 501 Butler Road; Springdale, Allegheny County, Pennsylvania 15144; 40°32′51″N 79°46′57″W

Information
- Type: Public High School
- Motto: Partnership for Excellence: Youth, School, & Community
- Established: 1931-32
- School district: Allegheny Valley School District
- Principal: Dr. Jessica Lindsay
- Grades: 7-12
- Enrollment: 438
- Student to teacher ratio: 7:1
- Area: 154,450 ft^{2}
- Campus type: Suburb
- Colors: Black and orange
- Athletics: Yes
- Athletics conference: WPIAL
- Mascot: Reddy Kilowatt
- Team name: Dynamos
- Rival: Riverview High School
- Newspaper: The Current
- Yearbook: Electra
- Acronym: SHS
- Website: www.avsdweb.org

Springdale Jr-Sr High School (SHS) is a public high school located at 501 Butler Road, Springdale, Pennsylvania. The school is part of the Allegheny Valley School District and has a total enrollment of approximately 400 students from grades 7-12.

==== Academics ====
Springdale Jr-Sr High School employs approximately 50 staff members as of 2023. The school offers a range of subjects (Mathematics, History, English, Sciences, etc.) and two foreign languages (Spanish & German).

==== Extracurricular activities ====
Springdale High school offers a variety of extracurricular programs, including academic clubs, performing arts, and athletics.

The school's marching band, known as the Springdale High School Dynamos Marching Band, was formed in 1935 and performs at football games, local parades, pep rallies, and other community events.

The SHS Drama Club produces theatrical performances twice a year (fall and spring); recent productions include Shrek (2025), Little Shop of Horrors (2024), and Seussical (2023).

Additional student organizations include subject-based clubs such as Biology, Art, Spanish, German, Chemistry, and Botany. The school also supports participation in national programs and organizations, including the National Honor Society (NHS), Students Against Destructive Decisions (SADD), Academic Games, Student Council, Key Club, and Future Business Leaders of America (FBLA).

Athletic programs are available for both junior and senior high students, with sports offerings including basketball, baseball, soccer, tennis, track and field, and football.

==== Building ====
The Springdale Jr-Sr High School Building features a cafeteria, two gymnasiums, an auditorium, science labs, main office, and several classrooms. It is made up of four main parts: A-Wing, B-Wing, C-Wing, D-Wing, and E-Wing. The latest alteration to the building was completed in May 2011 after the old D-Wing was demolished and reconstructed as a two-story structure with a large skylight in the ceiling. Along with this renovation was the addition of a second gymnasium, introducing the E-Wing and more bathrooms.

The C-Wing consists of band, choir, and art classes, the B-Wing consists of science and technology related classes, and the A-Wing and D-Wing contain several regular classes, such as mathematics, English, history, etc.

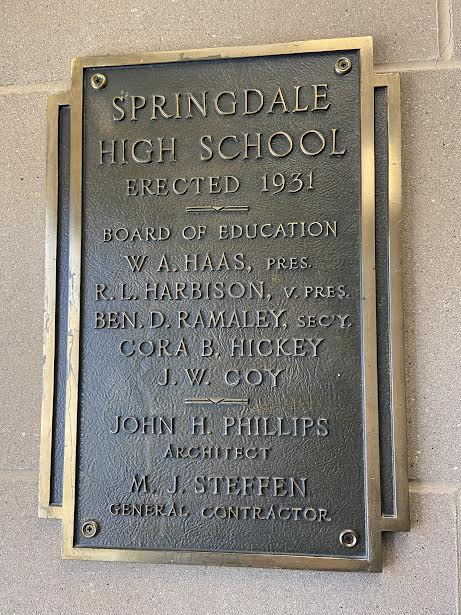
Original school building plaque

In 1931, the construction of a high school began on Robert W. Carson's (Rachel Carson's father) property facing Colfax Street. The construction was completed in 1932. In 1958, a senior high school was added to the existing school and faced Butler Road. The original building became the junior high school (grades 7-8). Now known as the D-Wing, this part of the school has since been razed and reconstructed in 2011 due to needing several expensive repairs.

Several areas of the school are dedicated to and named after significant individuals in the school's history. Listed below are some of them:

- Rachel Carson Conference Room, named for Rachel Carson
- Marshall Auditorium, named for Loyal S. Marshall
- McGhee Fieldhouse, named for Donald G. McGhee
- C-Wing, dedicated to David F. Kiser
- Main Office, dedicated to John E. McCloskey
- Courtyard, dedicated to Constance J. Craven, Ph. D.
- Technology Wing (B-Wing), dedicated to Richard L. Kapp
- Guidance Suite, dedicated to John Takach
- Former band room, dedicated to Duane E. Wareham

==== Allegheny Valley Athletic Stadium ====
Since 1939, the Springdale Dynamos football team played home games at Veterans Memorial Field, located about half a mile from the high school. The Allegheny Valley School District leased the field from the borough of Springdale, but in October 2022, the district ended the lease due to costly infrastructure issues. The lease officially expired after the 2023-24 school year, forcing the Dynamos to play all 2024-25 games at other schools' fields. With no clear replacement site, some speculated that the district might renovate the existing soccer field across Butler Road to accommodate football as well.

In March 2025, the district confirmed these plans, announcing a $2.68 million project to build a multi-use athletic field on district property. The new facility, developed in partnership with FieldTurf USA, Inc., featured a synthetic turf field and a surrounding track. Construction was completed in fall 2025, just before the football season, while the track was finished by spring 2026. The complex was officially named "Allegheny Valley Athletic Stadium" on September 25, 2026.
