= Plum, Pennsylvania =

Borough in Pennsylvania, US

- Borough
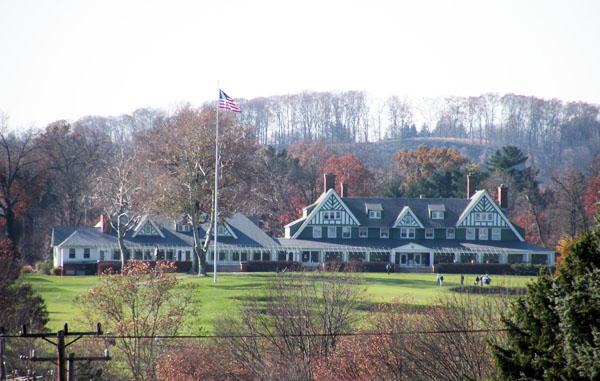
- Oakmont Country Club
- Interactive map of Plum, Pennsylvania
- Location within Pennsylvania Location within the United States
- Coordinates: 40°29′55″N 79°45′16″W
- Country: United States
- State: Pennsylvania
- County: Allegheny
- Founded as Plum Township: 1788

Area
  - Total: 28.94 sq mi (74.95 km^{2})
  - Land: 28.57 sq mi (74.00 km^{2})
  - Water: 0.37 sq mi (0.96 km^{2}) 1.34%

Population (2020)
  - Total: 27,144
  - Density: 950.1/sq mi (366.83/km^{2})
- FIPS code: 42-61536
- School district: Plum Borough
- Website: www.plumboro.com

Plum is a borough in Allegheny County, Pennsylvania, United States. The population was 27,144 at the 2020 census. A suburb of the Pittsburgh metropolitan area, it is located northeast of the city in what is commonly referred to as the East Hills suburbs.

Plum is often referred to as "Plum Boro" or more correctly "Plum Borough" by locals to distinguish it from its previous status as a township. It was founded as Plum Township in 1788 and was reorganized as a borough in 1956. The borough took its name from nearby Plum Creek.

== History ==
Plum Township was founded on December 18, 1788, as one of the original seven townships of Allegheny County. It originally extended as far south as Versailles (modern-day North Versailles Township), east to the county line, west to Pitt Township, and north to the Allegheny River. Plum has shrunk greatly over the years in area, but still remains among the larger municipalities in Allegheny County.

The 1889 history of Allegheny County, Pennsylvania, describes the township as having "no villages of importance", but listed the first postoffice, Antrim, 1840–1857; New Texas, a hamlet, in the geographic center of the township with "the usual mechanics, local stores, etc.", post office from 1856; and Logan's Ferry, on the Allegheny River and Allegheny Valley railroad, in the northeastern part of the township, deriving its name from early settler Alexander Logan and family, post office from 1844.

=== House explosions ===
Plum has a history of house explosions beginning in 1996, when one person was killed and one person injured; the explosion was caused by failure of gas pipes. Another explosion on March 5, 2008, which killed one and injured one, was also caused by failure of gas pipes. On April 22, 2022, an explosion happened which injured five, and the cause has yet to be determined. An explosion on August 12, 2023, killed six and injured two, and the cause is being investigated.

== Geography ==
According to the United States Census Bureau, the borough has a total area of 29.0 square miles (75 km^{2}), of which 28.6 square miles (74 km^{2}) is land and 0.4 square miles (1.0 km^{2}), or 1.34%, is water. Plum Borough is the second largest borough (area-wise) in the state of Pennsylvania.

=== Streams ===
- Pucketa Creek joins the Allegheny River where the creek forms the boundary between the borough of Plum and the city of Lower Burrell.
- Abers Creek
- Plum Creek rises in the borough.
  - Little Plum Creek

=== Surrounding communities ===
- Monroeville (south)
- Penn Hills (west)
- Oakmont (west)
- Harmar Township (north across Allegheny River)
- Cheswick (north across Allegheny River)
- Springdale (north across Allegheny River)
- Lower Burrell (north, in Westmoreland County)
- New Kensington (north, in Westmoreland County)
- Upper Burrell Township (northeast, in Westmoreland County)
- Murrysville (east, in Westmoreland County)

== Demographics ==
Historical population
Census	Pop.	Note	%±
1960	10,241		—
1970	21,932		114.2%
1980	25,390		15.8%
1990	25,609		0.9%
2000	26,940		5.2%
2010	27,126		0.7%
2020	27,144		0.1%

=== 2020 census ===
As of the 2020 census, Plum had a population of 27,144. The median age was 44.3 years. 19.8% of residents were under the age of 18 and 21.6% of residents were 65 years of age or older. For every 100 females there were 95.6 males, and for every 100 females age 18 and over there were 93.3 males age 18 and over.

95.0% of residents lived in urban areas, while 5.0% lived in rural areas.

There were 11,312 households in Plum, of which 26.7% had children under the age of 18 living in them. Of all households, 53.9% were married-couple households, 15.7% were households with a male householder and no spouse or partner present, and 24.7% were households with a female householder and no spouse or partner present. About 27.7% of all households were made up of individuals and 14.6% had someone living alone who was 65 years of age or older.

There were 11,869 housing units, of which 4.7% were vacant. The homeowner vacancy rate was 0.8% and the rental vacancy rate was 8.4%.

Racial composition as of the 2020 census
Race	Number	Percent
White	24,281	89.5%
Black or African American	1,201	4.4%
American Indian and Alaska Native	22	0.1%
Asian	327	1.2%
Native Hawaiian and Other Pacific Islander	6	0.0%
Some other race	180	0.7%
Two or more races	1,127	4.2%
Hispanic or Latino (of any race)	449	1.7%

=== 2010 census ===
At the 2010 census there were 27,126 people, 10,528 households, and 7,431 families living in the borough. The population density was 935.4 people per square mile. There were 10,528 housing units at an average density of 363.0 per square mile. The racial makeup of the borough was 93.9% White, 3.6% African American, 0.1% Native American, 1.1% Asian, 0.00% Pacific Islander, 0.2% from other races, and 1.0% from two or more races. Hispanic or Latino of any race were 0.9%.

There were 10,528 households, 29.5% had children under the age of 18 living with them, 62.6% were married couples living together and 29.4% were non-families. 24.5% of households were made up of individuals, and 12.6% were one person aged 65 or older. The average household size was 2.55 and the average family size was 3.09.

The age distribution was 24.2% under the age of 20, 2.5% from 20 to 24, 24.4% from 25 to 44, 29.6% from 45 to 64, and 16.8% 65 or older. The median age was 42.6 years. For every 100 females, there were 97.6 males.

The median household income was $66,680 and the median family income was $74,941. Males had a median income of $54,119 versus $40,625 for females. The per capita income for the borough was $30,474. About 3.8% of families and 4.8% of the population were below the poverty line, including 6.3% of those under age 18 and 3.2% of those age 65 or over.

== Government and politics ==
Boroughs in Pennsylvania (including Plum) are governed by a Mayor-Council system; in which the mayor has only a few powers and the council is the main legislative body. As of January 2020, the mayor is Harry Schlegel.

Presidential Elections Results
Year	Republican	Democratic	Third Parties
2024	54% 9,186	45% 7,636	1% 195
2020	54% 9,019	44% 7,406	2% 256
2016	58% 8,224	41% 5,739	1% 121
2012	57% 7,723	42% 5,633	1% 119

The municipality is not in the Pittsburgh city limits, but the United States Postal Service allows entities in the borough to use "Pittsburgh, Pennsylvania" in their mailing addresses, as the borough has been on a historical mailing route involving Pittsburgh.

== Education ==
The Plum Borough School District serves resident students living across Plum Borough in grades K–12. The district operates five school buildings: O’Block Elementary School (K-4), Pivik Elementary School (K-4), Holiday Park Intermediate School (5-6), Plum Middle School (7-8), and Plum Senior High School (9–12). The latest redistricting was approved by the Plum Borough School Board in 2018. There were once three other elementary schools, which were called Renton Elementary School, Regency Park Elementary, and the other called Adlai E. Stevenson, both have since been torn down. The Plum Borough School District is governed by a nine-member Board of Directors.

Plum Borough is also serviced by the Plum Borough Community Library. The library houses the history room of the Allegheny Foothills Historical Society (the Historical Society also provides tours of the reconstructed Carpenter Family Log House in Boyce Park).

== Landmarks ==
The Oakmont Country Club is predominantly located in Plum. It has hosted a record ten U.S. Opens (1927, 1935, 1953, 1962, 1973, 1983, 1994, 2007, 2016, and 2025). The club has also held three PGA Championships, five U.S. Amateurs, three NCAA Division I men's golf championships and two U.S. Women's Opens. The portion of the Pennsylvania Turnpike from mile markers 49 through 55 crosses through Plum.

== Notable people ==
- William D. Boyce, founder of the Boy Scouts of America
- Pat McAfee, media personality, former punter for Indianapolis Colts, former punter/kicker West Virginia Mountaineers football team
- Elias (real name Jeffrey Sciullo), professional WWE wrestler
- Alex Kirilloff, professional baseball player for Minnesota Twins
- R. J. Umberger, former National Hockey League player
- Matt Morgan, former tackle for the St. Louis Rams and Buffalo Bills; former tackle University of Pittsburgh football team.
- Thea Hail, professional WWE wrestler.

== See also ==
- Logans Ferry Mine Tunnel
