= Plum High School =

Coordinates: 40.5073°N 79.7670°W

Plum Senior High School

Location
- 900 Elicker Rd; Plum, Pennsylvania 15239; United States

Information
- Type: Public high school
- Staff: 71.81 (FTE)
- Enrollment: 1,249 (2023–2024)
- Student to teacher ratio: 17.39
- Campus: Suburban
- Color
- Mascot: Mustang
- Team name: Mustangs
- Website: http://www.pbsd.net

Plum Senior High School is a public high school and the only high school in Plum Borough School District located at 900 Elicker Road, Pittsburgh, PA 15239, United States. According to the National Center for Education Statistics, in the 2019–2020 school year, the school reported an enrollment of 1,162 pupils in grades 9th through 12th.

== Extracurriculars ==
The school offers clubs, activities and sports. Plum is known for its music program, boasting five bands, five choirs, and three orchestras.

=== Athletics ===
The district offers a publicly funded program. The District is part of the WPIAL sports organization.

- Cheerleading
- Cross country (coed)
- Golf (CoEd)
- Football
- Lacrosse
- Soccer (boys and girls)
- Tennis
- Volleyball (boys and girls)
- Basketball
- Rifle (CoEd)
- Swimming and diving (boys and girls)
- Wrestling
- Baseball
- Softball
- Track and field (boys and girls)

Club sports - indoor track, ice hockey, bowling and crew

== Notable alumni ==
- Pat McAfee (class of 2005) — host of The Pat McAfee Show, former punter for the Indianapolis Colts and professional wrestling color commentator
- Scott McGough (class of 2008) — relief pitcher for the Arizona Diamondbacks
- R. J. Umberger — former NHL player, Philadelphia Flyers, Columbus Blue Jackets
- Bill Wilmore (class of 1990) — professional bodybuilder
- Mike Miller (class of 1988) — quarterbacks coach for the Toronto Argonauts
- Steven Fabian — Inside Edition correspondent
- Alex Kirilloff — MLB baseball player, Minnesota Twins
- Jeffrey Sciullo (Elias) — professional wrestler, WWE
- Maddie Knisely (Thea Hail) — professional wrestler
