= Allegheny River =

River in Northeastern United States

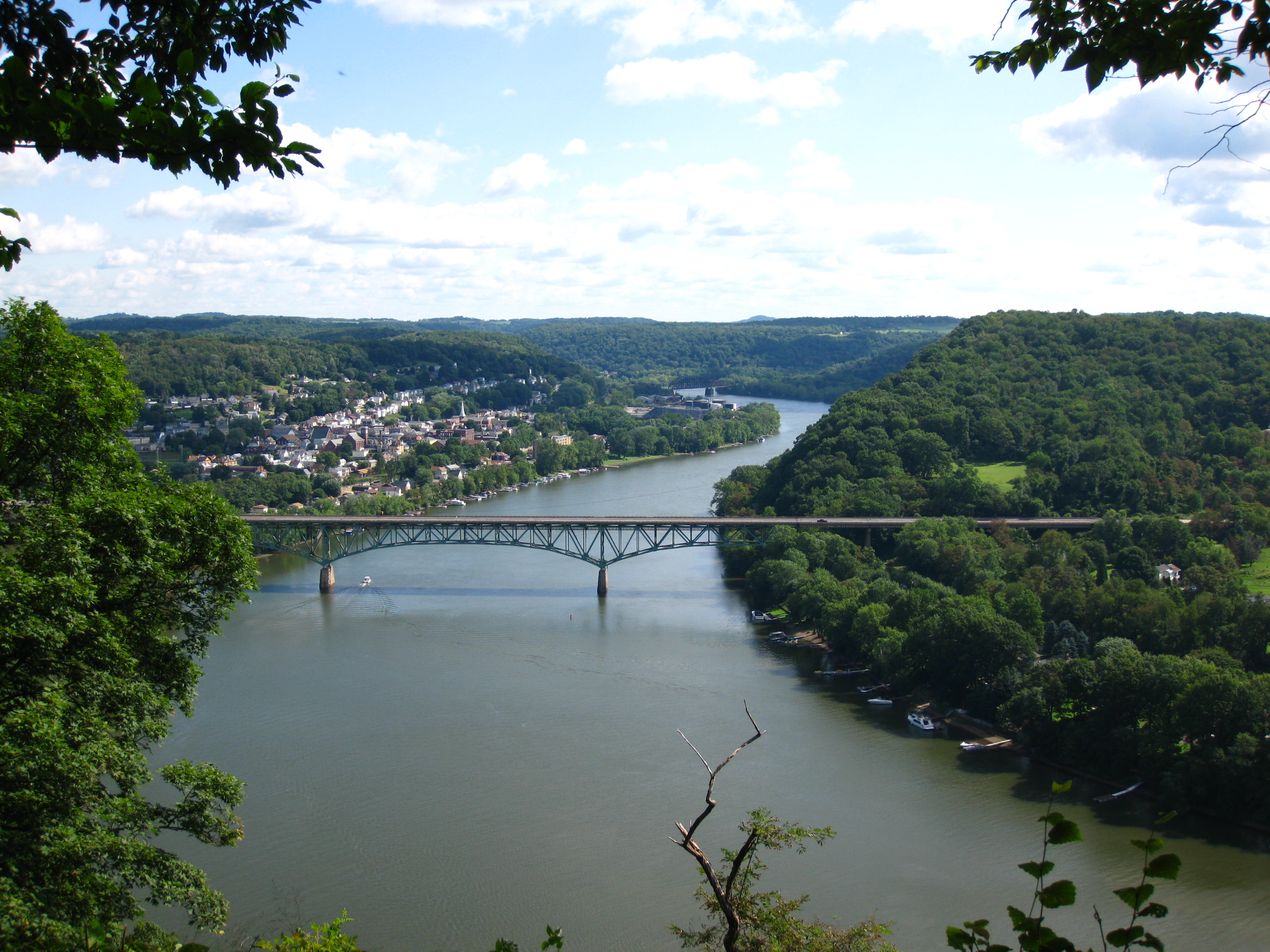
- The Allegheny River with Freeport, Pennsylvania in the background
- Native name: Alikehane (Unami); Ohi꞉yoʼ (Seneca)

Location
- Country: United States
- State: Pennsylvania, New York

Physical characteristics
- Source
  - location: Allegany Township, Pennsylvania, near Coudersport, Pennsylvania at the corner of Ben Green and Cobb Hill Roads
  - coordinates: 41°52′22″N 77°52′30″W
  - elevation: 2,450 ft (750 m)
- Mouth
  - location: Ohio River at Pittsburgh, Pennsylvania
  - coordinates: 40°26′36″N 80°00′52″W
  - elevation: 712 ft (217 m)
- Length: 325 mi (523 km)
- Basin size: 11,580 mi^{2} (30,000 km^{2})
- Discharge
  - average: 19,750 cu ft/s (559 m^{3}/s) at the village of Natrona, PA (river mile 24.3)

Basin features
- Progression: Allegheny River → Ohio River → Mississippi River → Gulf of Mexico
- Tributaries
  - left: Tionesta Creek, Clarion River, Redbank Creek, Mahoning Creek, Crooked Creek, Kiskiminetas River, Buffalo Creek, Chartiers Run
  - right: Conewango Creek, Brokenstraw Creek, Oil Creek, French Creek, Bull Creek, Deer Creek, Squaw Run, Pine Creek, Girtys Run, Pucketa Creek

National Wild and Scenic River
- Type: Recreational
- Designated: April 20, 1992

The Allegheny River (/ˌælɪˈɡeɪni/ AL-ig-AY-nee; Seneca: Ohi꞉yoʼ; Unami: Alikehane) is a 325-mile-long (523 km) river that is located in western Pennsylvania and western New York in the United States. The chief tributary of the Ohio River, the Allegheny runs from its headwaters just below the center of Pennsylvania’s northern border, heads northwest into Western New York, then zigzags southwesterly back across the border to flow through Western Pennsylvania and finally join the Monongahela River at Forks of the Ohio near Downtown Pittsburgh, Pennsylvania.

The Allegheny River is, by volume, the main headstream of both the Ohio and Mississippi Rivers. Historically, the Allegheny was considered to be the upper Ohio River by both Native Americans and European settlers.

This shallow river has been made navigable upstream from Pittsburgh to East Brady by a series of locks and dams that were constructed during the early 20th century. A 24-mile-long portion of the upper river in Warren and McKean counties of Pennsylvania and Cattaraugus County in New York forms the Allegheny Reservoir, which was created by the erection of the Kinzua Dam in 1965 for flood control.

The etymology behind the word "Allegheny" is of unclear pre-Columbian origin and may be derived from one of a number of Delaware/Unami phrases that are homophones of the English name, with varying translations.

== Etymology ==
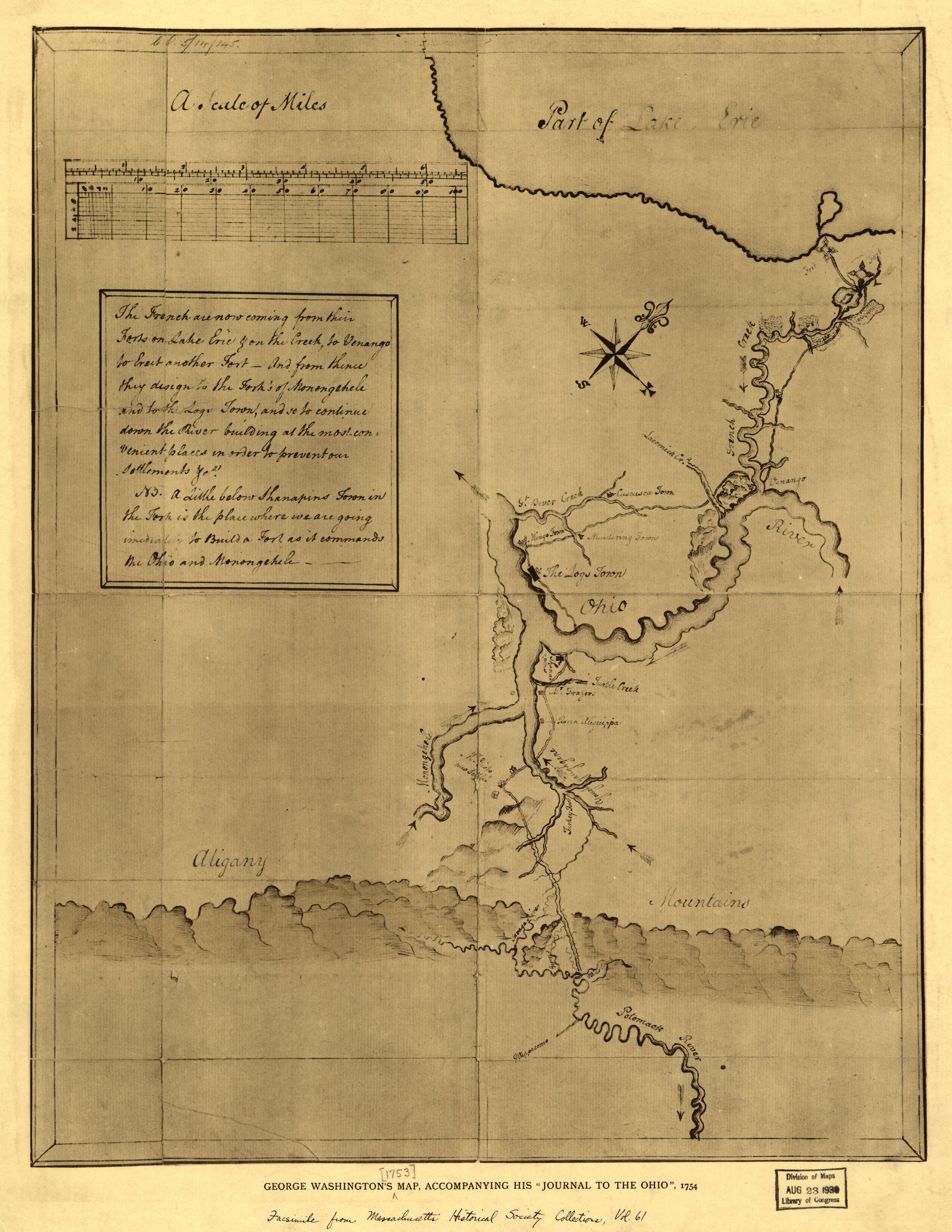
In this sketch by George Washington, the Allegheny River is named Ohio

The name Allegheny probably comes from Lenape welhik hane or oolikhanna, which means 'best flowing river of the hills' or 'beautiful stream'. There is a Lenape legend of a tribe called "Talligewi" who used to live along the river. Frederick Webb Hodge cited Henry Schoolcraft to connect the "Talligewi" to the Cherokee.

The following account of the origin of the name Allegheny was given in 1780 by Moravian missionary David Zeisberger: "All this land and region, stretching as far as the creeks and waters that flow into the Alleghene the Delawares called Alligewinenk, which means 'a land into which they came from distant parts'. The river itself, however, is called Alligewi Sipo. The whites have made Alleghene out of this, the Six Nations calling the river the Ohio."

The Delaware Tribe of Indians gives the Lenape name as Alikehane, "river where footprints can be seen."

Native Americans, including the Lenape and Iroquois, considered the Allegheny and Ohio rivers as the same, as is suggested by a New York State road sign on Interstate 86 that refers to the Allegheny River also as Ohi꞉yoʼ. The Geographic Names Information System lists O-hee-yo and O-hi-o as variant names. The river is called Ohi:'i:o` (river beautiful) in the Seneca language. In New York, areas around the river are often named with the alternate spelling Allegany in reference to the river; for example, the Village of Allegany and Allegany State Park. Port Allegany, located along the river in Pennsylvania near the border with New York, also follows this pattern.

== Course ==
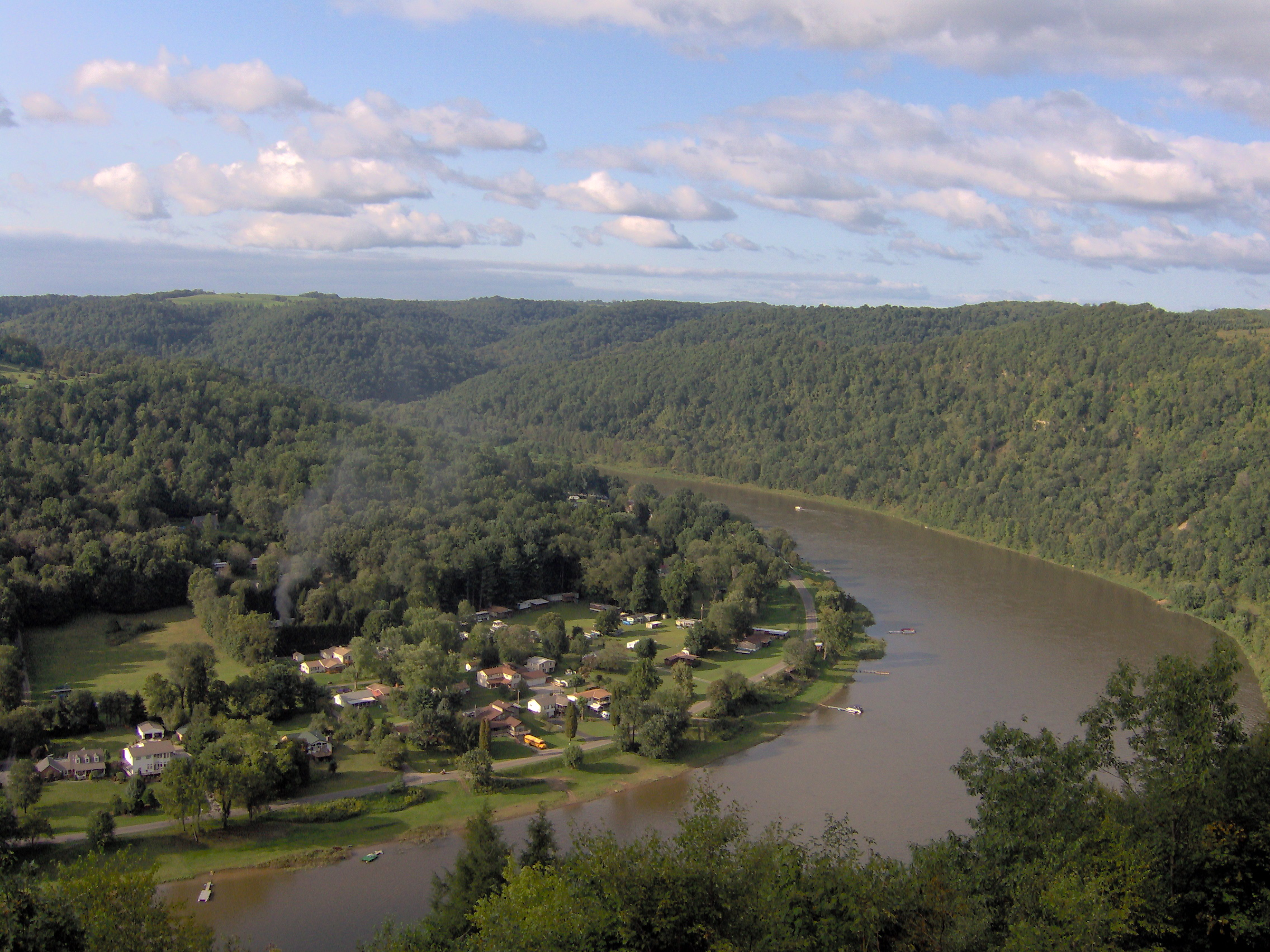
Much of the Allegheny River's course is through hilly woodlands.

The Allegheny River rises in north central Pennsylvania, on Cobb Hill in Allegany Township in north central Potter County, 8 miles (13 km) south of the New York–Pennsylvania border and a few miles northwest of the eastern triple divide. The stream flows south and passes under Pennsylvania Route 49 11 miles northeast of Coudersport where a historical marker that declares the start of the river is located. Cobb Hill is about a mile north. The stream flows southwest paralleling Route 49 to Coudersport.

The route continues west to Port Allegany, where thereafter the river joins with a number of small streams and widens considerably before turning north and crossing into western New York. Looping westward across southern Cattaraugus County for approximately 30 miles (48 km), past Portville, Olean, Allegany and Salamanca, the river flows through Seneca Indian Nation lands close to the northern boundary of Allegany State Park before re-entering northwestern Pennsylvania within the Allegheny Reservoir just east of the Warren-McKean county line, approx. 10 miles (16 km) northeast of Warren.

It flows in a broad zigzag course generally southwest across Western Pennsylvania; first flowing southwest past Warren, Tidioute, Tionesta, Oil City, and Franklin, forming much of the northwestern boundary of Allegheny National Forest. South of Franklin it turns southeast across Clarion County in a meandering course, then turns again southwest across Armstrong County, flowing past Kittanning, Ford City, Clinton, and Freeport.

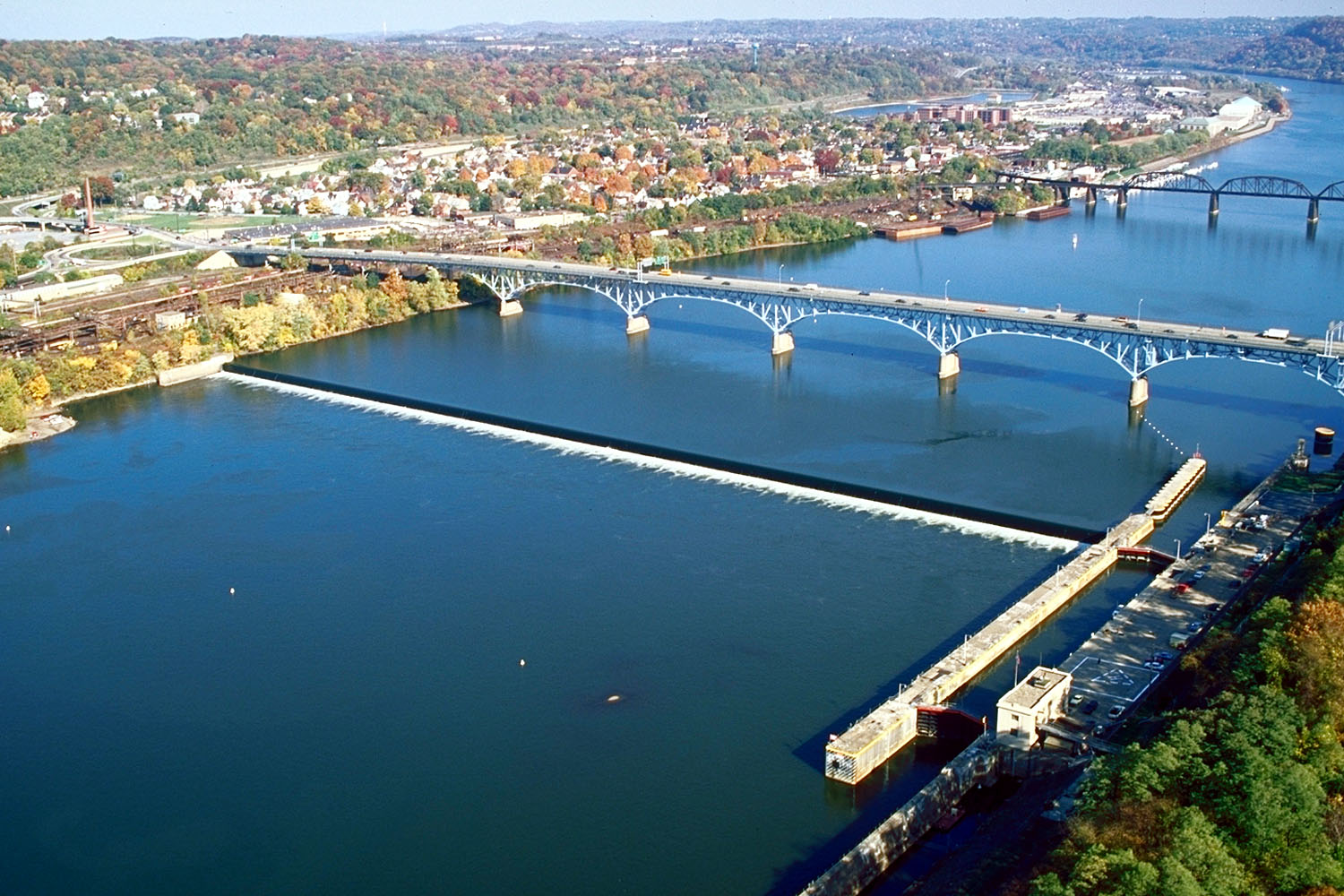
The Highland Park Bridge crosses the Allegheny River at Aspinwall, Pennsylvania, just above Allegheny River Lock and Dam No. 2.

The river enters both Allegheny and Westmoreland counties, the Pittsburgh suburbs, and the City of Pittsburgh from the northeast. It passes the North Side, downtown Pittsburgh, and Point State Park. The Allegheny joins with the Monongahela River at the "Point" in downtown Pittsburgh to form the Ohio River.

== Hydrography ==
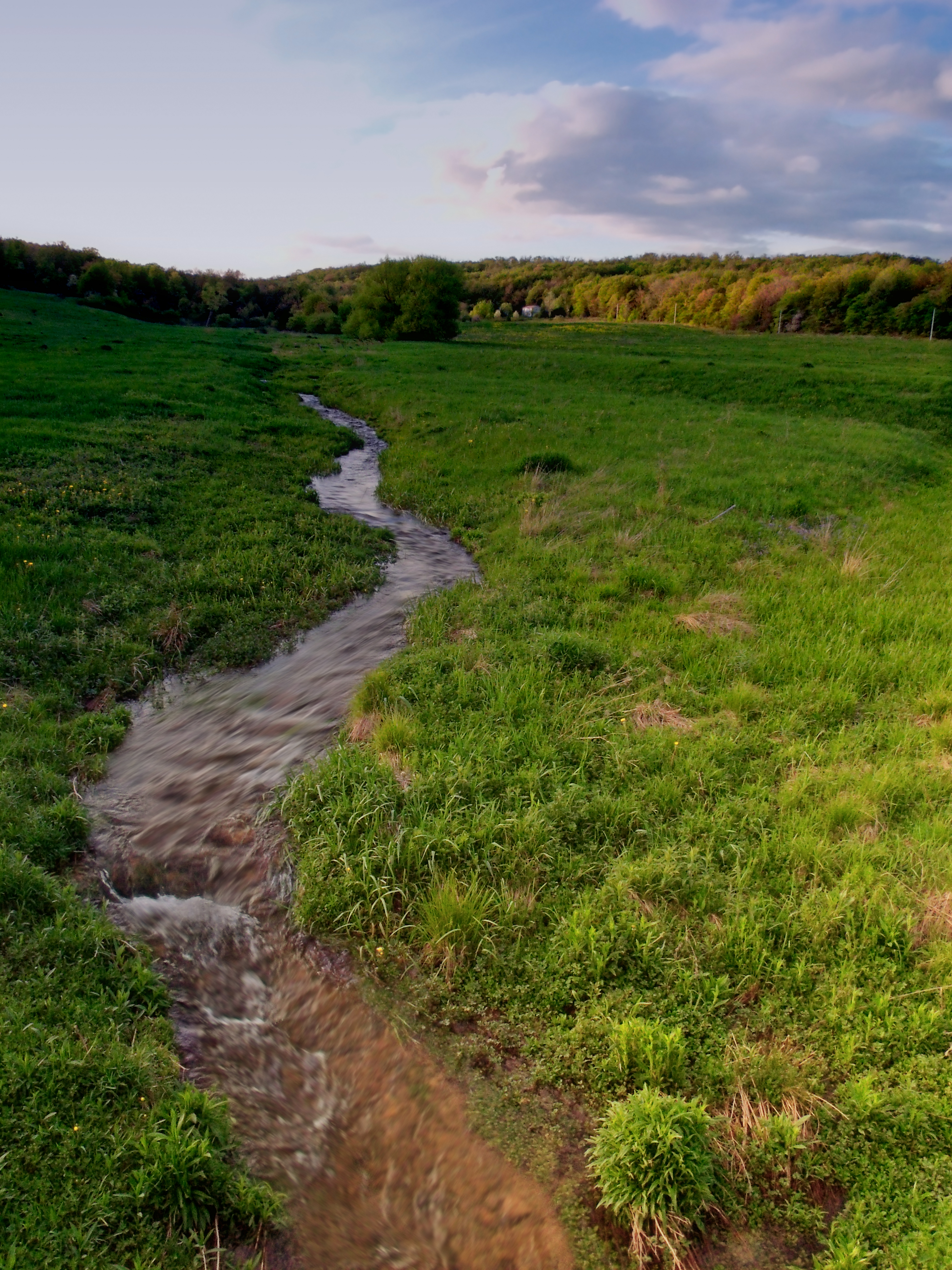
The headwaters of the Allegheny River are in this meadow in Potter County

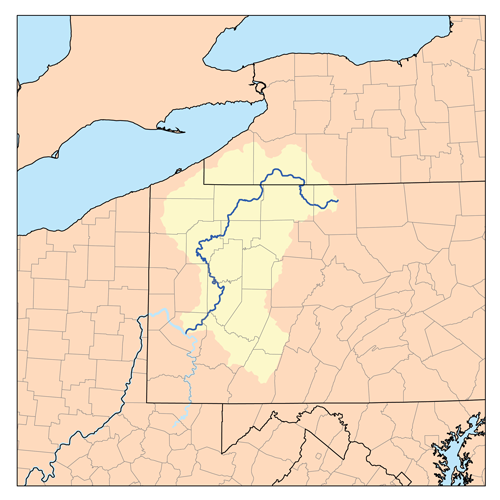
The Allegheny River drainage basin covers parts of New York and Pennsylvania in the United States.

The river is approximately 325 mi (523 km) long, running through the U.S. states of New York and Pennsylvania. It drains a rural dissected plateau of 11,580 sq mi (30,000 km^{2}) in the northern Allegheny Plateau, providing the northeasternmost drainage in the watershed of the Mississippi River. Its tributaries reach to within 8 mi (13 km) of Lake Erie in southwestern New York.

Water from the Allegheny River eventually flows into the Gulf of Mexico via the Ohio and Mississippi rivers.

The Allegheny Valley has been one of the most productive areas of fossil fuel extraction in United States history, with its extensive deposits of coal, petroleum, and natural gas.

=== Tributaries ===
In its upper reaches, the Allegheny River is joined from the south by Potato Creek 1.7 mi (2.7 km) downstream of Coryville, Pennsylvania and from the north by Olean Creek at Olean, New York. Tunungwant "Tuna" Creek joins the river from the south in Carrollton, New York (flowing north from Bradford, Pennsylvania); the Great Valley Creek and Little Valley Creek join the river from the north at Salamanca, New York before becoming the Allegheny Reservoir.

After re-entering Pennsylvania, the river is joined from the east by Kinzua Creek 10 mi (16 km) upstream of Warren; from the north by Conewango Creek at Warren; from the west by Brokenstraw Creek; from the east by East Hickory Creek at East Hickory; from the east by Tionesta Creek at Tionesta; from the north by Oil Creek at Oil City; from the west by French Creek at Franklin; from the east by the Clarion River, a principal tributary, at Parker; from the east by Crooked Creek southeast of Kittanning; and from the east by the Kiskiminetas River, another principal tributary, at Schenley.

Buffalo Creek enters at Freeport, Chartiers Run enters at Lower Burrell, Bull Creek enters at Tarentum, Pucketa Creek enters near New Kensington, Riddle Run enters at Springdale, and Girtys Run enters at Millvale. And finally, the confluence of the Monongahela River and Allegheny form the Ohio River at downtown Pittsburgh. Many additional streams enter or join with the Allegheny River along its course.

=== Locks, dams and bridges ===
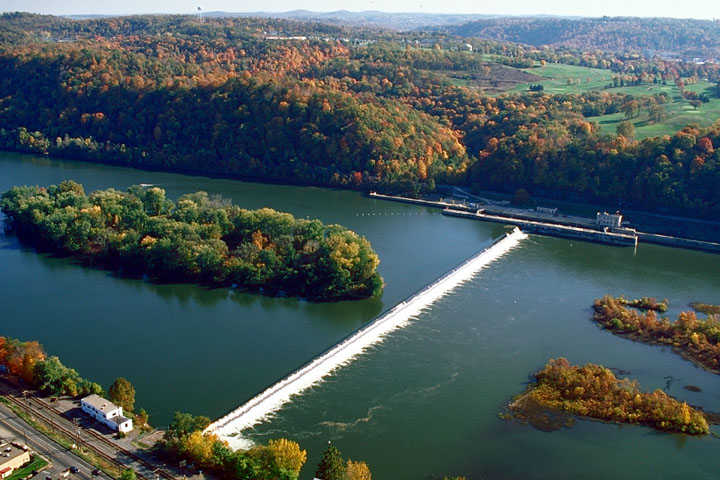
The eastern part of Allegheny Islands State Park and the C. W. Bill Young Lock and Dam (No. 3) on the Allegheny River

Several locks were built in the early 20th century to make the Allegheny River navigable for 72 miles upstream from Pittsburgh to East Brady.

The Allegheny River has eight locks and fixed-crest dams numbered two through nine: Allegheny River Lock and Dam No. 2, 3, 4, 5, 6, 7, 8, 9 which form corresponding reservoirs.

The river is also impounded by the Kinzua Dam in northwestern Pennsylvania, resulting in the Allegheny Reservoir also known as Kinzua Lake and Lake Perfidy among the Seneca. The Seneca Pumped Storage Generating Station is associated with Kinzua Dam.

Numerous bridges and tunnels span the river throughout its course. The Allegheny River Tunnel, utilized by Pittsburgh Light Rail, went into service in 2012.

== History ==
In the latter half of the 17th century, control of the river valley passed back-and-forth between Algonquian-speaking Shawnee and the Iroquois. By the time of the arrival of French colonialists in the early 18th century, the Shawnee were once again in control and formed an alliance with France against attempts by colonists from British North America to settle across the Allegheny Mountains. The conflict over the expansion of Anglo-American settlement into the Allegheny Valley and the surrounding Ohio Country was a primary cause of the French and Indian War in the 1750s. During the war, the village of Kittanning – the principal Shawnee settlement on the river – was completely destroyed during the Kittanning Expedition, which saw 300 provincial troops from the Province of Pennsylvania brutally attack the settlement.

After gaining control of the area in the 1763 Treaty of Paris, the British kept the area closed to Anglo-American colonists, in part to repair and maintain relations with the Native Americans. After the American Revolutionary War, the entire river valley became part of the new United States, and U.S. settlers forcibly displaced the region's indigenous population. During the 19th century, the river became a principal means of navigation in the upper Ohio valley, especially for the transport of coal. Although the building of the railroads lessened the importance of the river somewhat, the lower river (navigable as far as East Brady, Pennsylvania through locks) has continued to serve as a route of commercial transportation until the present day. In 1859, the first U.S. petroleum was drilled north of the river at Titusville. One of the underlying premises of the Genesee Valley Canal was its connection to the river, opening a trade route from Rochester, New York to the west. The advent of the railroads obviated any interest Pennsylvania might have had in participating to improve navigation on the river. The canal was closed in 1877 and the right-of-way sold to the Genesee Valley Canal Railroad.

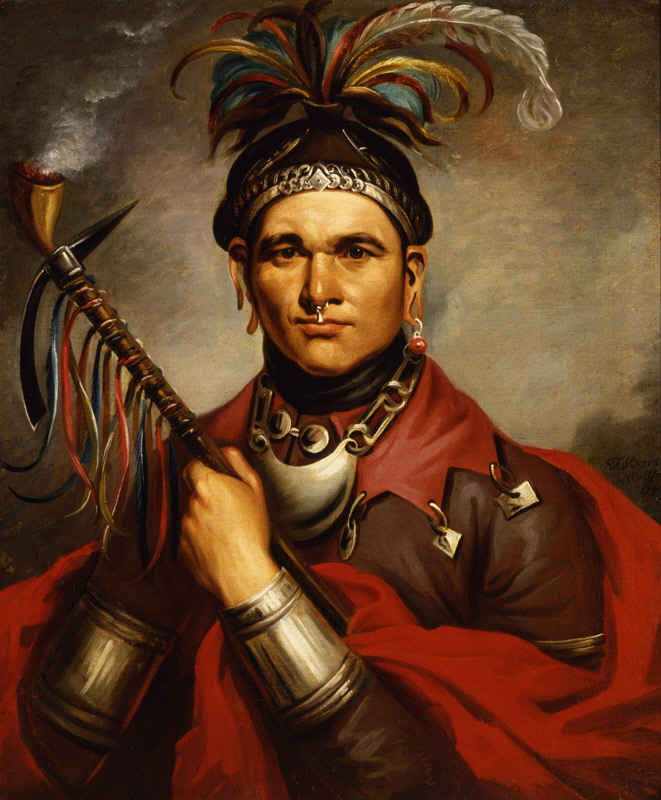
Seneca Chief Cornplanter

In 1965, the completion of the federally sponsored Kinzua Dam for flood-control in northwestern Pennsylvania east of Warren created the long Allegheny Reservoir, known as Lake Perfidy among the Seneca, part of which is included in the Allegheny National Recreation Area. The dam flooded parts of lands deeded "forever" to the Seneca Nation of Indians by the 1794 Treaty of Canandaigua, and lands given to Cornplanter and his descendants. The event was described in the Johnny Cash song "As Long as the Grass Shall Grow" from the 1964 album Bitter Tears: Ballads of the American Indian, which focused on the history of and problems facing Native Americans in the United States.

The construction of the dam and the filling of the Allegheny Reservoir also necessitated the elimination of the small village of Corydon, which was located at the confluence of Willow Creek with the Allegheny River; and the small village of Kinzua, which was located at the confluence of Kinzua Creek with the Allegheny River. All residents of both villages were forced to move.

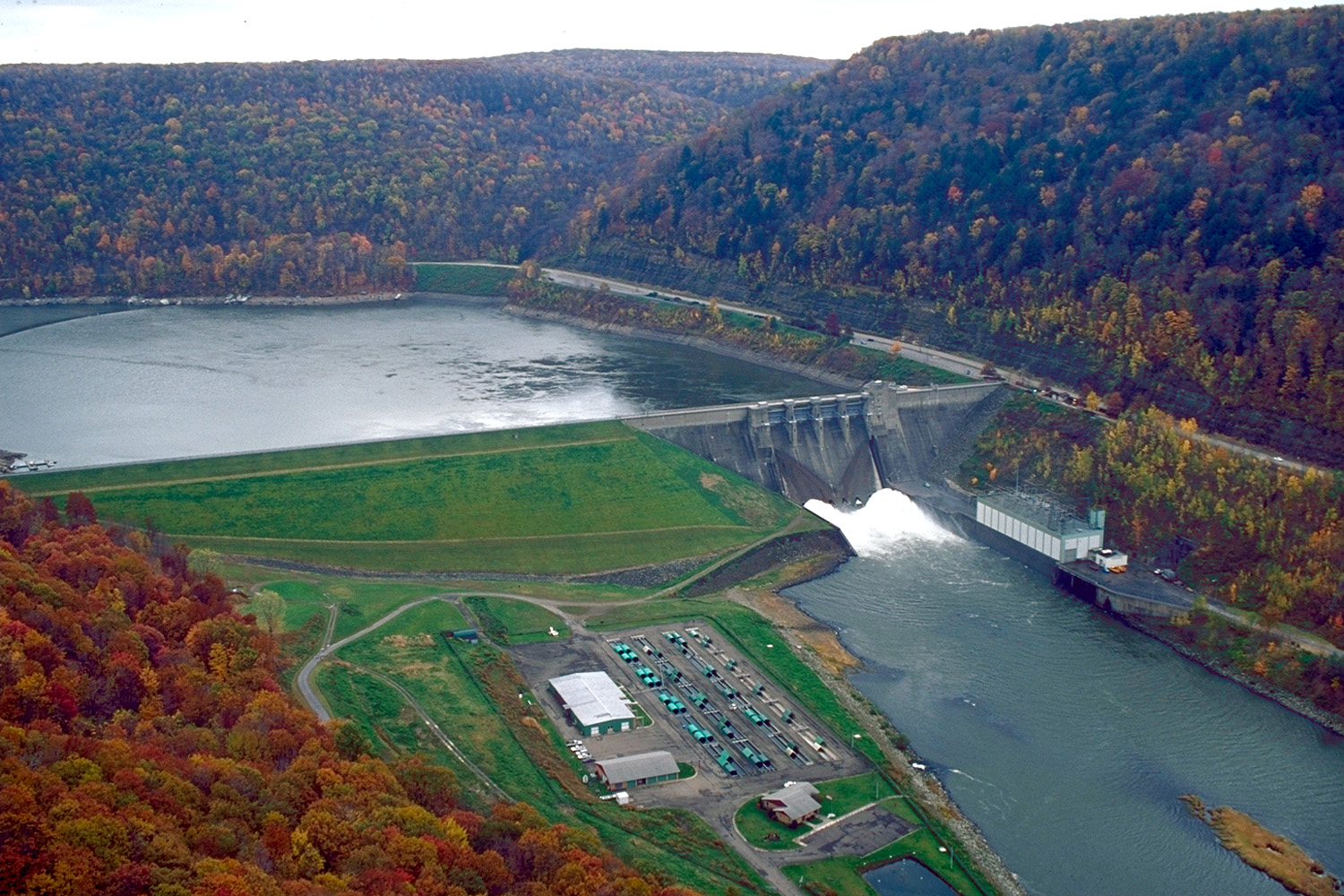
The Kinzua Dam and Allegheny Reservoir

Many prominent individuals opposed the construction of the dam at that time because of the damage it would do to Seneca lands, including Pennsylvania Congressman John P. Saylor of Johnstown, and Howard Zahniser, executive director of The Wilderness Society and native of Tionesta—a small settlement located along the Allegheny River several miles downstream from Warren. During the campaign for the 1960 United States presidential election, John F. Kennedy assured the Seneca Nation that he would oppose the dam if elected. However, he failed to follow through on his pledge upon becoming president.

In 1992, 86.6 mi (139.4 km) of the Allegheny River was designated Wild and Scenic. This designation comprises three segments of the river located in Warren, Forest, and Venango counties.

The Allegheny River was designated River of the Year by the Pennsylvania Organization for Rivers & Watersheds in 1994, 2017, and 2024.

== In popular culture ==
Depression-era folk singer Buster Red recorded "Allegheny River", wherein the river is a destructive force throughout life, but not necessarily a malignant one.

Folksinger Pete Seeger's song "Where the Old Allegheny and Monongahela Flow", depicts a character living in a city pining for a return to the Allegheny River.

Old Crow Medicine Show released a song entitled "Allegheny Lullaby" that detailed life along the Allegheny in late 20th century Rust Belt towns, the river serving as a metaphor for escape.

In 2008, Katie Spotz became the first person to swim the entire 325 mi (523 km) of the Allegheny River; she was accompanied by safety kayaker, James Hendershott. The team began at the river's source in Warren, Pennsylvania on July 22 and finished at the "Point" in Downtown Pittsburgh on August 21.

In 2017 the documentary Lake of Betrayal was released detailing the struggle of the Seneca Nation over the Kinzua Dam project on the Allegheny in the 1960s.

== Settlements ==
=== New York ===
- Allegany
- Carrollton
- Jimerson Town
- Olean
- Portville
- St. Bonaventure
- Salamanca
- Weston Mills

=== Pennsylvania ===
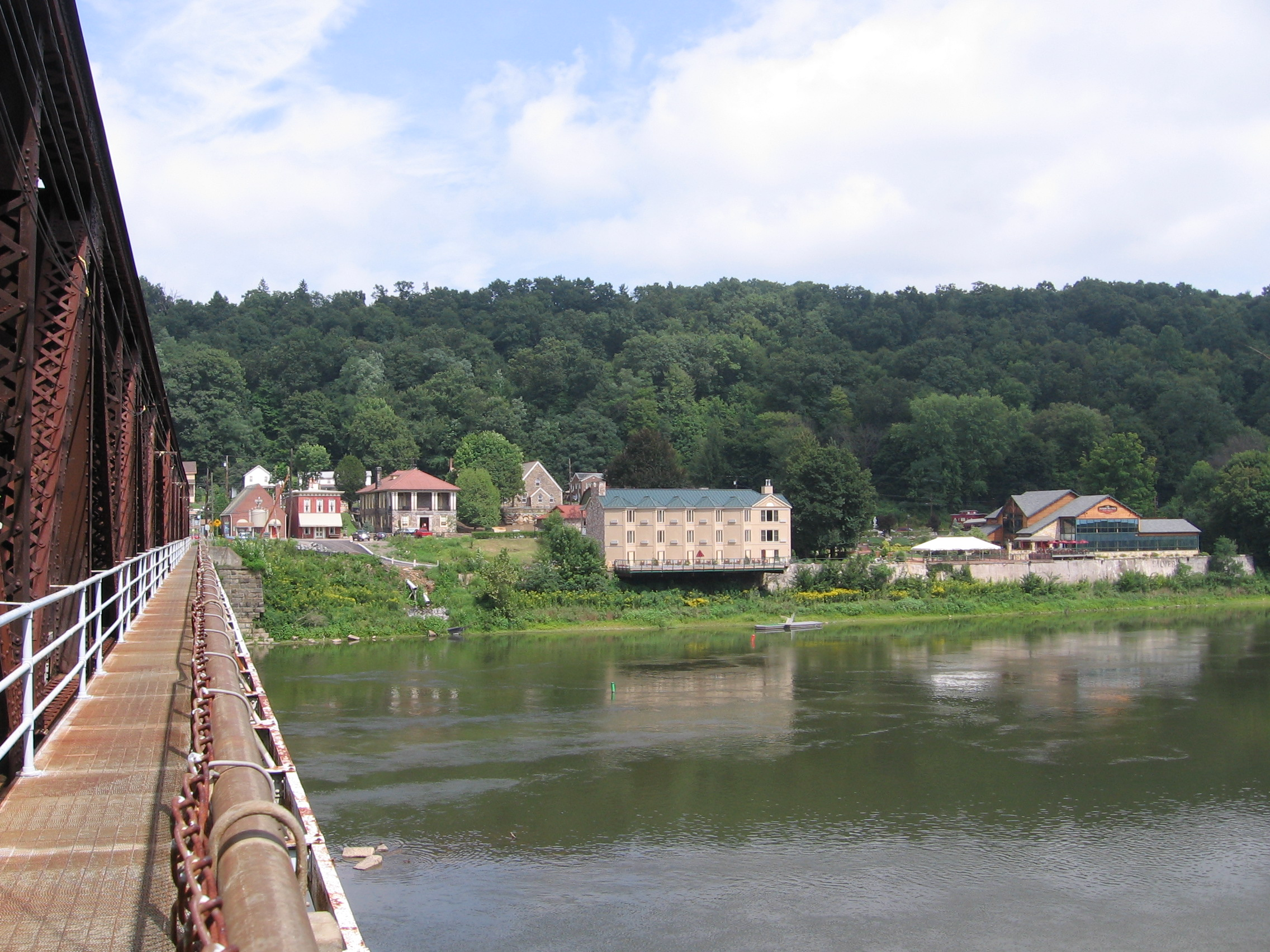
The Allegheny River at Foxburg, Pennsylvania

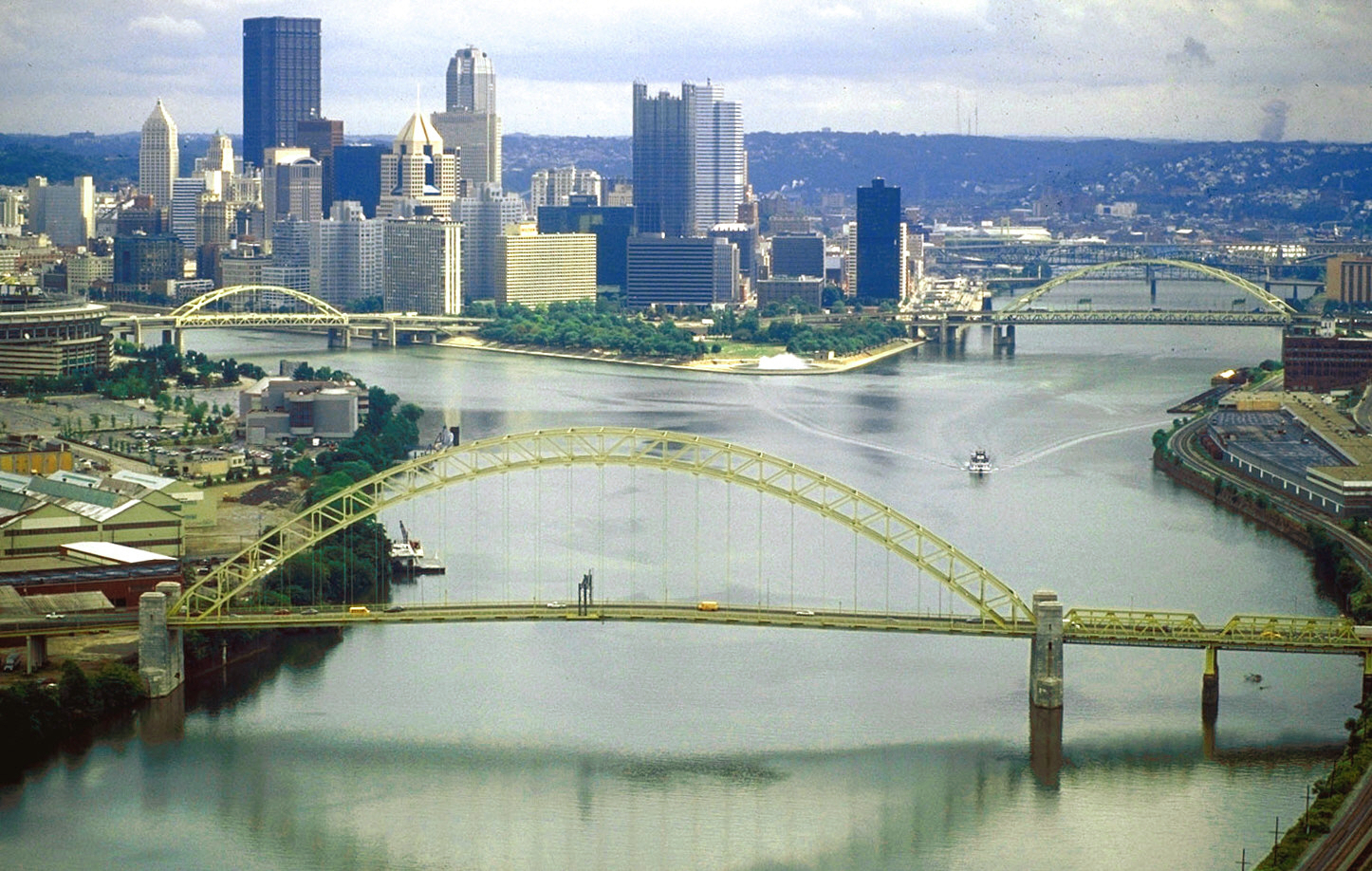
The Allegheny (left) and Monongahela (right) join to form the Ohio River at Pittsburgh, Pennsylvania.

- Applewold
- Arnold
- Aspinwall
- Blawnox
- Brackenridge
- Cheswick
- Coudersport
- Creighton
- East Brady
- East Hickory
- Eldred
- Emlenton
- Etna
- Ford City
- Foxburg
- Franklin
- Freeport
- Harmarville
- Kennerdell
- Kittanning
- Lower Burrell
- Manorville
- Millvale
- Natrona
- New Kensington
- Oakmont
- Oil City
- Parker
- Penn Hills
- Pittsburgh
- Plum
- Port Allegany
- Roulette
- Schenley
- Sharpsburg
- Springdale
- Starbrick
- Tarentum
- Templeton
- Tidioute
- Tionesta
- Verona
- Warren
- West Hickory
- West Kittanning
- Woodland Heights
- Youngsville

== See also ==
- Allegheny Islands State Park
- Allegheny Riverfront Park
- List of rivers of New York
- List of rivers of Pennsylvania
- Pittsburgh Flood of 1936
- Pittsburgh Three Rivers Regatta
