= Mellon Park =

Park in Pittsburgh, Pennsylvania

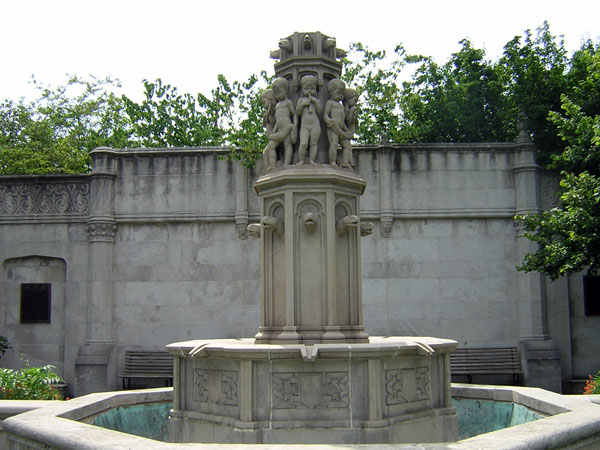
- The fountain in Mellon Park
- Interactive map of Mellon Park
- Type: Municipal Park
- Location: Pittsburgh, Pennsylvania United States
- Coordinates: 40°27′7.47″N 79°55′4.99″W
- Established: 1943
- Operator: City of Pittsburgh Parks & Recreation (CitiParks)
- Website: Official website
- Mellon Park
- U.S. National Register of Historic Places
- Pittsburgh Historic Designation
- NRHP reference No.: 100008596

Significant dates
- Added to NRHP: February 2, 2023
- Designated PGHL: February 24, 2021

Mellon Park is a park in the Shadyside and Point Breeze neighborhoods of Pittsburgh, Pennsylvania, straddling both sides of Fifth Avenue, from approximately Shady Avenue to Penn Avenue, the western corner abutting Pittsburgh Center for the Arts building. The southern part of the park is home to the Walled Garden and the park holds events throughout the year. It is also home to several recreational facilities.

The park is on the list of landmarks recognized by the Pittsburgh History and Landmarks Foundation (PHLF), and has been listed on the National Register of Historic Places.

== History ==
The park was established in 1943, on the grounds of the former estate of Richard B. Mellon. His was the largest mansion in Pittsburgh. The mansion was built by Italian immigrants from New Kensington, PA, under the direction of Monsignor Nicola Fusco. These industrious men then built the monumental Mount St. Peter Church in New Kensington, which still stands and functions to this day from the materials of the Mellon Mansion. The gardens were originally designed in 1912 by Alden and Harlow. Several other architects added their own touch to the landscape, including the Olmsted Brothers and some seventeen years after the garden began, Vitale and Geiffert. After Mellon's sixty-room home was brought down during World War II, most of the garden still remained and was transformed into a city park known now as Mellon Park. The park also contains the Phipps Garden Center and Pittsburgh Center for the Arts.

== The Walled Garden ==
The Walled Garden is surrounded by walls of brick and limestone and is one of Gothic design. The garden's fourth wall was part of the Mellon mansion before its demolition in the 1940s. A fountain stands between the garden and the rest of the park. Vitale and Geiffert were behind the planning of this garden. The Mellon Park Project wanted to create a memorial in memory of Ann Katherine Seamans, who frequented the Walled Garden repeatedly after being introduced to it in kindergarten. Janet Zweig, an artist chosen by the project team, turned the floor of the garden into an exact replica of the sky in Pittsburgh on the day Ann was born. The piece is entitled 7:11AM 11.20.1979 79°55'W 40°27'N. There are 150 stars, and each is a light in the ground and includes an inscription about it. It is possible to sponsor a star and make a donation. The Pittsburgh Parks Conservancy and LaQuatra Bonci Associates was responsible for the planning and supervising of the garden's redemption. The park was reopened on June 12, 2010.

== A Fair in the Park ==
Any form of an event can potentially take place in Mellon Park with permission from the City of Pittsburgh Department of Public Works. One event that has taken place annually since 1969 is A Fair in the Park put on by the Craftsmen's Guild of Pittsburgh in the month of September. This is a contemporary craft festival with a small concert. There is an area just for children. No admission fee is charged.

== Mellon Park Tennis Center ==
The Mellon Park Tennis Center is a year-round facility that offers classes for younger children ages 4–7 and other age groups up to adults. Along with the tennis courts Mellon Park includes a playground, basketball courts, and baseball fields.
