= Pedestrian Drama =

Artwork by Janet Zweig

- Artist: Janet Zweig
- Year: 2011
- Type: kinetic sculpture
- Location: East Wisconsin Ave. and North Prospect Ave., Milwaukee, Wisconsin; 43°2′21.258″N 87°54′0.037″W
- Owner: City of Milwaukee

Pedestrian Drama is a site-specific public art work by American artist Janet Zweig, located on the east end of Wisconsin Avenue in downtown Milwaukee, Wisconsin. The artwork consists of a series of mechanical flaps, like signage associated with public transportation, that present animated narratives. The mechanical flap displays are installed on five kiosks on existing light poles.

The $300,000 work was commissioned by the City of Milwaukee and Wisconsin Department of Transportation. Zweig collaborated with 200 local actors, film makers, and fabricators throughout the process of creating the work.

The site of Pedestrian Drama, near Northwestern Mutual, connects Milwaukee's lakefront with downtown.

Zweig is based in Brooklyn, and she is primarily a public artist. Pedestrian Drama is her first art commission in Milwaukee.

== See also ==
- 7:11AM 11.20.1979 79°55'W 40°27'N
