= Mount St. Peter Church =

Historic church in Pennsylvania, United States

- Mount Saint Peter Catholic Church
- U.S. National Register of Historic Places
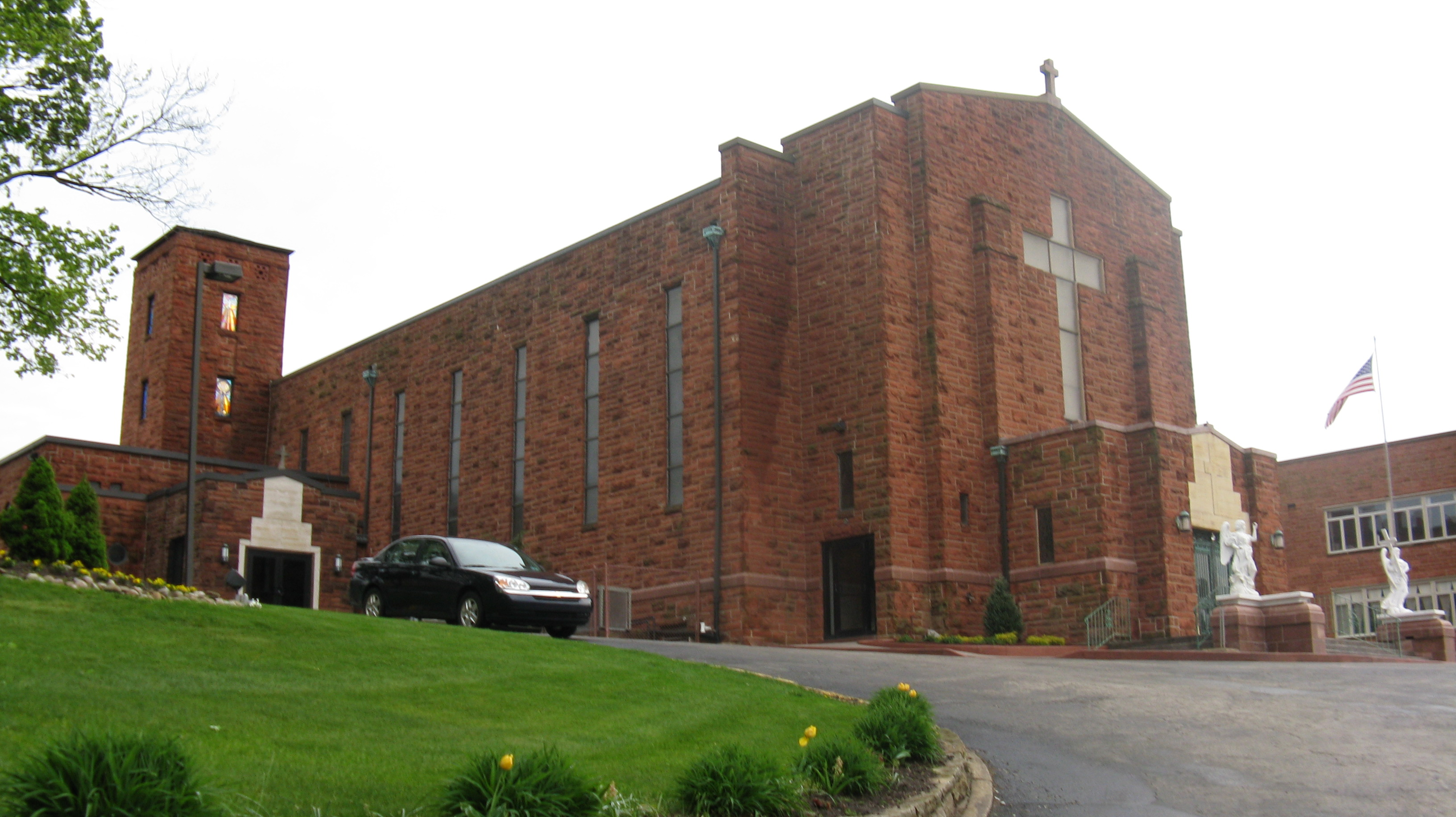

- Location within Pennsylvania Location within the United States
- Location: 100 Freeport Road, New Kensington, Pennsylvania
- Coordinates: 40°33′46″N 79°45′42″W
- Area: 3.1 acres (1.3 ha)
- Built: 1942
- Architect: Enos Cooke
- Architectural style: Art Deco, International style
- MPS: Aluminum Industry Resources of Southwestern Pennsylvania MPS
- NRHP reference No.: 98000398
- Added to NRHP: May 5, 1998

Mount Saint Peter Church is a Catholic church at 100 Freeport Road in New Kensington, Pennsylvania. The church is located along the Allegheny River and is approximately 25 mi (40 km) north-east of the city of Pittsburgh within the Diocese of Greensburg.

The congregation was founded by Italian immigrants in the early 1900s and the current building was constructed by hand by parish members during World War II using materials from the then recently dismantled Richard B. Mellon 60-room mansion in Pittsburgh. The church was dedicated on July 4, 1944. In 1998, the building was listed on the National Register of Historic Places.

As of 2009, the congregation had approximately 5,000 members. The church is regionally known for its annual Festa Italiana, at which there is homemade Italian food, dancing, games for children, and gambling for adults. This festival is organized by volunteers from the church and takes place on the church grounds during the first weekend in August. The mission statement of the church emphasizes the congregation's Italian heritage.

== History ==
The history of the Mount St. Peter parish is woven with the history of Alcoa and the emergence of New Kensington as an industrial city in the early twentieth century. In 1890, the Burrell Improvement Company considered the advantages of the level land south of its home in Lower Burrell. They named the area New Kensington, surveyed it, and laid out avenues, running parallel to the Allegheny River, and numbered streets running perpendicular to the river. Fourth and Fifth streets were the primary commercial streets. Once the land was surveyed and plotted, the company opened the land to bidding. The first large company to purchase land, the Pittsburgh Reduction Company, acquired a 3.5-acre (14,000 m^{2}) property by the riverfront. Other companies also acquired sites for commercial and industrial development: Adams Drilling, Goldsmith and Lowerburg, New Kensington Milling, New Kensington Brewing, Logan Lumber, and Keystone Dairy, to name a few.

The presence of Pittsburgh Reduction Company (later Alcoa) provided a boon for development. On Thanksgiving Day 1888, with the help of Alfred E. Hunt, Charles Martin Hall developed an experimental smelting plant on Smallman Street in Pittsburgh, Pennsylvania. In 1891, the company established its production facility in New Kensington.

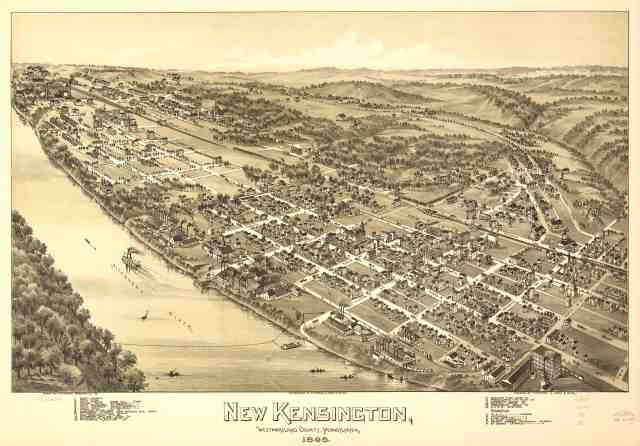
New Kensington, prior to its industrial development and the influx of several hundred Italian immigrants.

By 1910, the city was also the home of a car manufacturing company, the New Kensington Automobile Company. In addition, the Pittsburg [sic] Motor Car Company had established a production plant for its Pittsburg Six model in New Kensington. By 1904, the American Tin Plate Company (capital stock owned by the United States Steel Corporation) had established the six facilities of the Pittsburgh Mills and six of the Pennsylvania Mills in New Kensington.

=== Diocese of Greensburg ===
The Diocese of Greensburg, to which Mount Saint Peter now belongs, was established on March 10, 1951, by Pope Pius XII. Records show that the first Mass in the area was celebrated in the Allegheny Mountains in 1749 by a French priest serving as chaplain to French troops. Demetrius Augustine Gallitzin, the second priest ordained in territories that became the United States, arrived in Loretto, Pennsylvania in 1799. Father Boniface Wimmer came to Latrobe from Germany and established the first Benedictine presence in the region of Saint Vincent in 1846.

Prior to the United States' Civil War, Catholicism grew slowly in America, but afterward, it became more widespread as Catholic immigrants from eastern Europe moved to the four counties, which include Armstrong, Fayette, Indiana, and Westmoreland, to mine coal and produce coke to fire steel mills in Pittsburgh. This influx of Catholic immigrants resulted in the creation of more than 80 parishes and missions in the counties between 1865 and 1917.

=== Founding and early days of St. Peter parish ===
By 1900, the burgeoning industrial town had 4,600 residents and two years later Reverend Bonaventure Piscopo, a member of the Apostolic Band for the Diocese of Pittsburgh, formed a new congregation in New Kensington to serve the immigrant work force, many of whom were Italian Catholics. The church was named after Saint Peter, the first pope. The parishioners of this new congregation were Italians living in and around New Kensington, Arnold, and Parnassus, which later became a part of the city of New Kensington. These immigrants needed a place to worship and in 1903, the St. Peter congregation began holding Mass with a resident pastor, Reverend Vincenzo Maselli in a small building on the corner of Second Avenue and Tenth Street (known as the downtown area) in New Kensington.

Soon after, on September 28, 1903, the congregation relocated to the basement of St. Mary's Polish Church, which was also located in New Kensington. Here, the first parish register was created. The first recorded event in the new parish was a marriage on December 27, 1903. Soon after, the Burrell Improvement Company donated land on the corner of Ridge Avenue and Constitution Boulevard. On July 4, 1905, the cornerstone of St. Peter Church was laid and on September 25, 1905, Bishop Regis Canevin dedicated the new church.

In 1908, the number of attendees at St. Peter Church began to dwindle. Many of the priests who had served the congregation had been reassigned a few years earlier. In 1908, a popular priest, Father Sacchi, was sent to Mother of Sorrows Church in McKees Rocks, Pennsylvania. Parishioners formed a committee to go speak to the Bishop on Father Sacchi's behalf. Although Father Sacchi was not allowed to return to St. Peter, Reverend James Vocca, who had also been at St. Peter prior to his reassignment, was brought back to the church.

At this time, the priests who were part of St. Peter were doing the best they could to keep the faith alive in their congregation. The priests were smart men who had attended school in Italy prior to their immigration, but most were unable to speak fluent English. At a time when immigrants were desperately trying to fit into the American life and be as American as possible, going to a church where the congregation was Italian was not the most desirable choice. Therefore, many Catholic Italians began going to churches and many others changed their religion altogether. Many of these Italians were becoming Protestant. The priests were poorly paid and most lived on about twenty-five cents per day. They had no permanent housing: many slept in the church itself, and preferred the altar floor because it was the only place in the church that had carpeting. It was also common for the priests to say Mass several churches on the same day. These circuits trips were sometimes as much as twenty-five miles away.

=== Italian anarchist movement ===
Around 1918, the leaders of the Italian Communists and Anarchists in the United States settled themselves in New Kensington. The group was guided by the ideas of Carlo Tresca, a union organizer for Industrial Workers of the World, which were recorded first, in his newspaper La Plebe, or The Worker, and later in his anti-fascist paper, Il Martello (which translates to "the hammer"). The Italian Communists and Anarchists harassed members of the Catholic Church. Italians who did go the church were made to feel inferior and many became too intimidated to go to church at all. At St. Peter's, one priest was shot through a window while he was sitting at his desk. Another priest was threatened that if he did not leave New Kensington he would be killed. In 1918, there were only thirteen families who attended Mass at St. Peter on Sunday. This continued for several years until Carlo Tresca moved from New Kensington to New York City in 1925.

By 1929, St. Peter was crowded for all three Masses on Sunday morning. There were so many people that the balcony, the sanctuary, and both sacristies were opened seating. Eventually the priests opened the doors of the church and hundreds of people stood outside on the steps to hear the Mass. Despite all of these accommodations, there were still many people who were turned away because there was not enough space to accommodate them. There were about a thousand families who belonged to St. Peter parish, but the church itself only had about two hundred seats in the pews. In 1933, Bishop Hugh Boyle suggested the construction of a larger church and the congregation decided to construct a larger building. The new church building was constructed by the parishioners, who broke ground in May 1941 and three years later dedicated the new building.

=== World War II affects the congregation ===
By May 1944, the parishioners had contributed to the war having given thousands of pints of blood to the Blood Banks; given money to the war relief campaigns; been active on the home front, and sent 808 men and women to the Armed Forces. There was a group that prepared and sent out a weekly special bulletin to the parishioners in the Armed Forces. These parishioners were happy to receive news from home on the progress of their new church and many of them sent home money to go towards the building fund. During the war, hundreds of dollars came in from these parishioners fighting in the war. Of the 808 parishioners who went off to war, seven died and their names were engraved on a piece of granite outside of the church: James DiMuzio, Arthur Capo, Nick Costelli, Justine DeFelices, Neal Chipoletti, and Anthony Zaffuto.

== Relocating and building a church by hand ==
The current location was found to be too small and the congregation was in need of a larger building. Parishioners from Arnold wanted the new church to be built in their town, arguing that most of the congregation lived there. Those from Parnassus wanted the church closer to them because there were a lot of Catholics but no Catholic church in Parnassus. The parishioners from New Kensington argued that St. Peter should remain close to its current location and one was found on the corner of Freeport Road and Seventh Street. This location was approximately 100 yd (91 m) from the previous St. Peter Church and was located on the top of a hill. The land was 4 acres (1.6 ha) and had a large mansion and a few small buildings on the property.

The land had once belonged to Stephen M. Young, who had been a General in the United States Army during the American Civil War and was a friend of Abraham Lincoln. Young sold the property to Frank M. Curtis for $7,000 in 1902. It was sold to David A. Leslie for $17,000 in 1914. After Mr. Leslie's death in August 1938, attorneys spoke to Mrs. Leslie about selling the property and she agreed to sell for $20,000 cash. On December 1, 1938, the congregation made a down payment of $500 cash and few days later, the Building Fund Campaign opened for the new church with a committee of one-hundred volunteers. Each parishioner who was employed full-time should sign a pledge to give $60 over a period of five years towards the building of the church. The committee was split up into groups, and the volunteers went door to door almost every day for five years until enough money was collected.

On April 1, 1939, St. Peter's congregation took possession of the land and mansion. That day, it was decided the new church would be called "Mount St. Peter". By May 1, instead of having $20,000 as anticipated, the building campaign had generated $23,500 in cash and another $75,200 in pledges.

=== Acquiring materials from the Mellon Mansion ===
Marble from the Mellon Mansion that is engraved with parishioners' names and located in the parking lot behind the church

Architect Enos Cooke of New Kensington developed the plan for the church building. In 1940, a friend of the church, John Stanish, informed Mt. St. Peter's congregation that the Mellon mansion, 6500 Fifth Avenue, in Pittsburgh, Pennsylvania, was to be demolished. Stanish had worked for the three Mellon brothers until the last of them died in 1938. The Mellon family had spent years entertaining important people, including royalty, celebrities, well known financiers, and statesmen in the Mellon Mansion. It was built using Michigan sandstone and was four stories high on one side and three stories high on the other. The mansion had sixty-five rooms, plus halls and vestibules. There were 11 bathrooms, one of which had cost over $10,000 to complete because the walls and floor were covered in Italian marble and the fixtures were plated in gold. At one time, a hundred servants had maintained the house and surrounding grounds. The mansion had been completed in 1909 and had cost Mr. Mellon approximately three million dollars. The inside was filled with marble from all over the world, including China, Japan, and India. There were bronze doors cast in England, hand painted ceilings, and steel beams manufactured by the Carnegie Steel Company. In addition, one of the most expensive organs in the world was housed in this building. The items which the mansion contained were being sold for less than their actual values. For example, a half a million dollars' worth of furniture had been sold for $3,800. The building contained many items that could easily be used in a church. There were mantles that could become altars and pieces of architecture, such as angel statues, that could be placed in Mount St. Peter Church. In 1940, St. Peter's congregation bought all of the stone, granite, marble, bronze doors, and railings from the mansion. In addition, the congregation purchased thirty tons of steel beams, sixty-five oak doors, chandeliers, and some other items, and the members transported all of the marble 27 miles (43 km) from Pittsburgh to New Kensington. The location of the mansion is now home to Mellon Park.

Many men of the congregation volunteered to transport the materials to New Kensington. The congregation found a contractor, Mr. Charles Camarata, to direct the free labor. Camarata had built hundreds of miles of road in the state of Pennsylvania and around the country. In addition, he had constructed homes, civic buildings, and churches. As soon as he agreed to take the job in December 1940, he split the volunteers into three groups. Camarata personally supervised the first group, which removed the marble from Mellon Mansion. The second group transported the marble to New Kensington and the third placed the materials on the grounds of Mt. St. Peter. This project started on December 13, 1940, and continued until May 26, 1941. The process was difficult and time consuming, made more difficult by the harsh winter of 1940–1941.

=== Building Mt. St. Peter Church ===
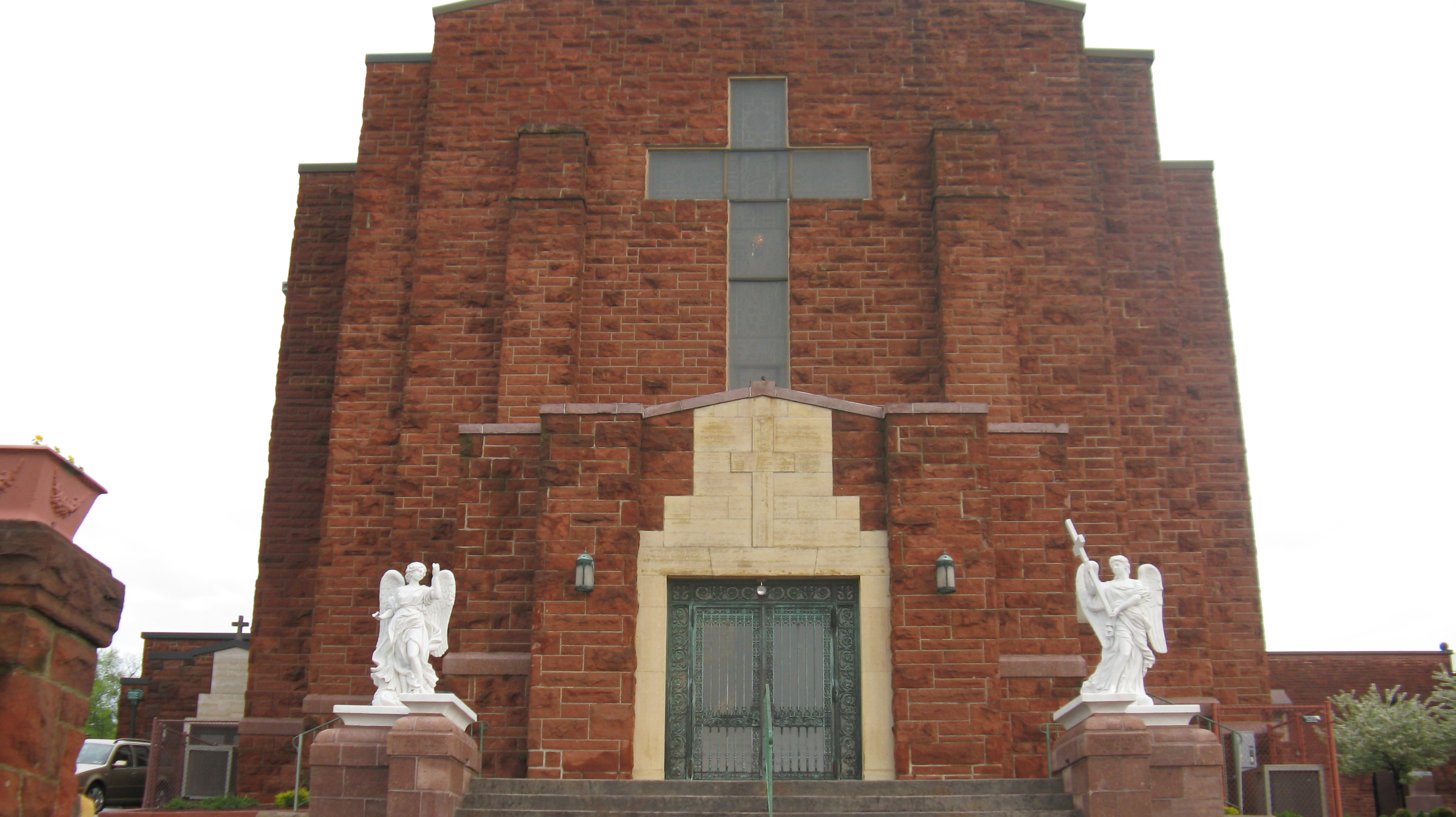
Front doors of the church

On Sunday, May 25, 1941, ground was broken for Mount St. Peter Church. The event was celebrated by the priests of St. Peter's congregation and about two thousand people showed up to watch. The cornerstone was blessed on Sunday, September 7, 1941, by Reverend Alfred Koch, who was the Arch Abbot of St. Vincent in Latrobe, Pennsylvania. Many other priests from the area were also present. Father Paul Tomlinson of St. Peter's Church in Pittsburgh delivered the sermon in English and Archabbot Koch closed the ceremony with the Pontifical Benediction in Italian. The large red cornerstone was made of granite and was fitted with an iron box. The box contained the memorial reports of the congregation, newspapers, American and Papal coins, and medals of the church. The cornerstone was placed so that it can be seen from inside the church. It is located by the altar of the Sacred Heart.

=== Fund raising ===
At the time, only about $15,000 from the building fund was still available since money had already been spent on buying the property and materials from the Mellon Mansion. Further fund raising generated 1,200 pledges, 95 percent of which were fulfilled: 60 percent of the money came from 10 percent of the parishioners and approximately 10 percent of the people did not contribute at all. During this time, all of the books concerning the finances of the construction of the new church were kept by ladies of the St. Peter's Cenacle. The ladies not only recorded all of the pledges and collections, but they also recorded all notices and minutes from their meetings. While the church was being built, the Campaigners met almost every evening.

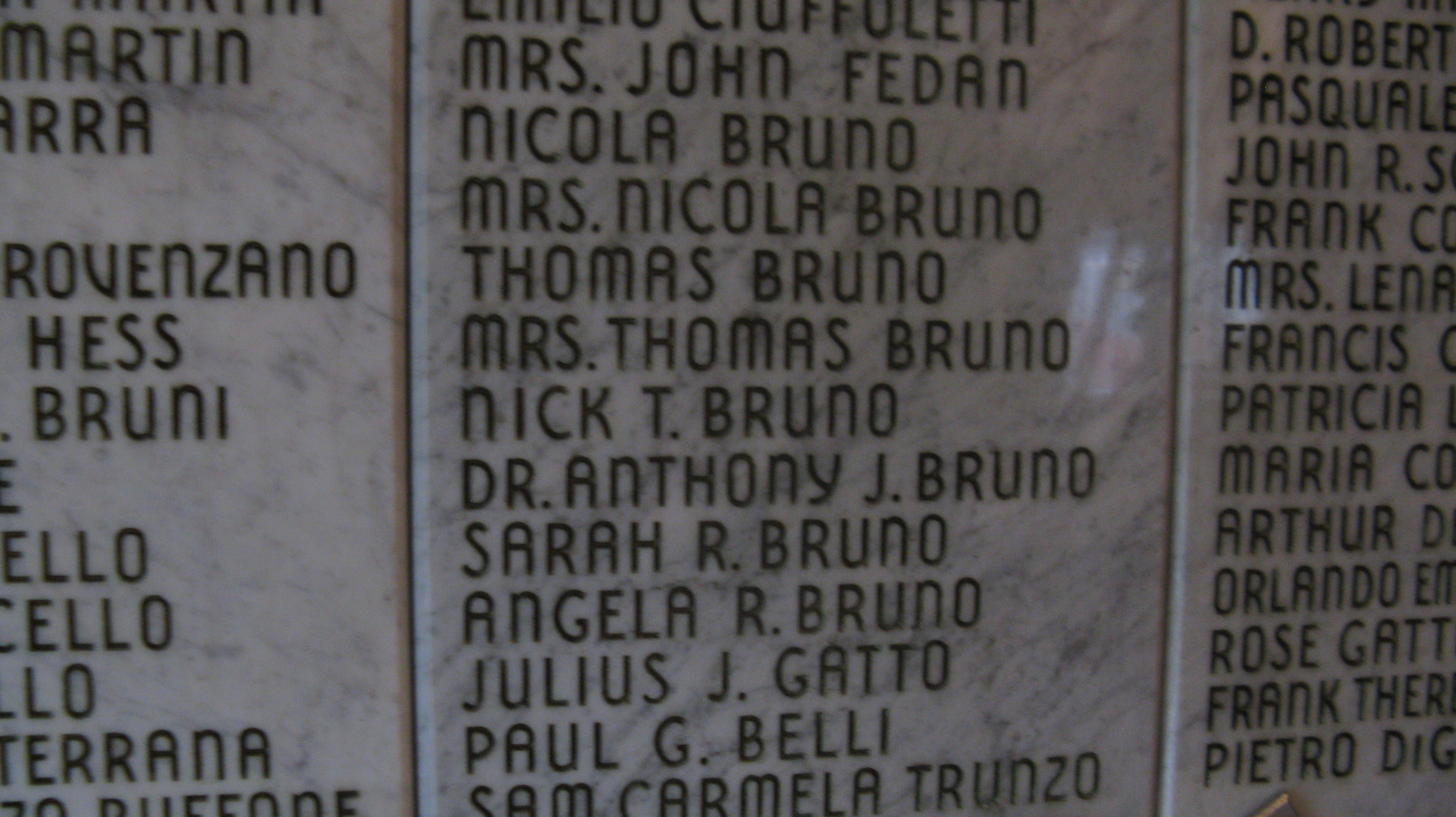
Names of parishioners who donated to or helped build the church

The Cenacle was run under the supervision of Dom C. Shiarella, the treasurer of the First National Bank in New Kensington and the cashier of the Building Fund Campaign. He was in charge of collecting all of the pledges made toward the Building Fund. This work kept him in the bank for one or two hours longer than the other employees every evening. This went on for almost five years. Mr. Shiarella was also in charge of making sure there was enough money in the church's bank account for the payroll that was taken out every other Friday. The needed funds were always collected in time and there was never a week when the account bounced.

By October 1941, there was little money left, and the parish sold a house it possessed on Constitution Boulevard for $7,000, which was enough to pay off the $3,000 of debt. The other $4,000 covered some of the continuing costs of construction.

=== Raising the roof ===
Around this time, winter was threatening and in order for the walls of the new church to be protected from potential damage, the roof had to be laid before any snow began to fall. This meant that more workers were needed to get the job done faster. This was a problem because the church's account did not contain enough money to employ more men. As soon as the committee of 100 became aware of this, they began asking for help. They found 30 parishioners who were each willing to lend another $500 each. These parishioners had already given high contributions to the new church but were still willing to help. As a result, the church had an extra $15,000 to pay for the construction of the roof. Every day for about two months, over fifty parishioners worked on building the church roof. In December 1941, the roof was completed. One of the men who helped complete the roof read about the attack on Pearl Harbor in the newspapers and decided to quit his work on the church and enlist in the United States Air Force. James DiMuzio was the congregation's first casualty in the war. There is a plaque with his name and date of death on the pier.

The winter of 1941–1942 ended up being mild through all of December and most of January and workers were able to continue work on the church until January 27, 1942. On January 4, 1941 a blizzard carried 30-mile-per-hour (48 km/h) winds and left 3 feet (0.91 m) of snow. The blizzard forced workers inside the church. Camarata became the director of excavations, concrete, block, brick, stone and marble works, steel structures, road-grading, electric and plumbing systems, carpentry, and landscaping. John Stanish was now his assistant. He built marble grinders, hoisting devices, marble cutters, and marble sanders. He worked with much machinery, including bulldozers, steam-shovels, grading-tractors, and steam-rollers. Stanish collected marble, iron and bronze grilles, electric and plumbing equipment, lumber, panels, light fixtures, paint, chemicals, and ceiling and floor materials from Pennsylvania, Ohio, and New York. So much time and effort was put in by this one man. As a token of the parish's gratitude to him, an inscription was placed in the main vestibule of Mt. St. Peter Church, on the right, going down into the Marble Hall (downstairs of the church). The Latin inscription reads, Joannes Stanish Res Procuravit (John Stanish procured the material).

Much of the work inside the church was done by volunteers under the direction of paid plumbers, electricians, and craftsmen. In addition, all of the pattern-makers and mechanics who worked on the building did so without pay. There was also a group of women who shined marble and granite until the pieces were full of luster.

The dome over the altar was built by Alex Guadagno. He was an Italian immigrant who came to the US IN 1921. He worked for his Uncle P J Greco who owned a scrap yard in Creighton. He opened his own business and one of his works was the Iron and Bronze dome. Alex business was Gains Ornamental Iron Works and was also located in Creighton.

== Opening of Mt. St. Peter Church ==
By mid-summer of 1942, Mt. St. Peter Parish was once again without funds. By this time, the majority of the work on the new church had been completed and so the congregation agreed that it was time to sell the old St. Peter Church in order to fund the new church. The General Electric Company was willing to pay $16,000 for St. Peter's and on July 16, 1942, the church became the property of the General Electric Company.

Sunday, August 9, 1942, was a day of mixed emotions for the congregation. At twelve o'clock noon, one final Mass was said in the old St. Peter Church, which had been the house of the congregation for the past thirty-eight years. People cried as the Blessed Sacrament was carried out of the church by the pastor. The congregation followed the pastor up to the new church.

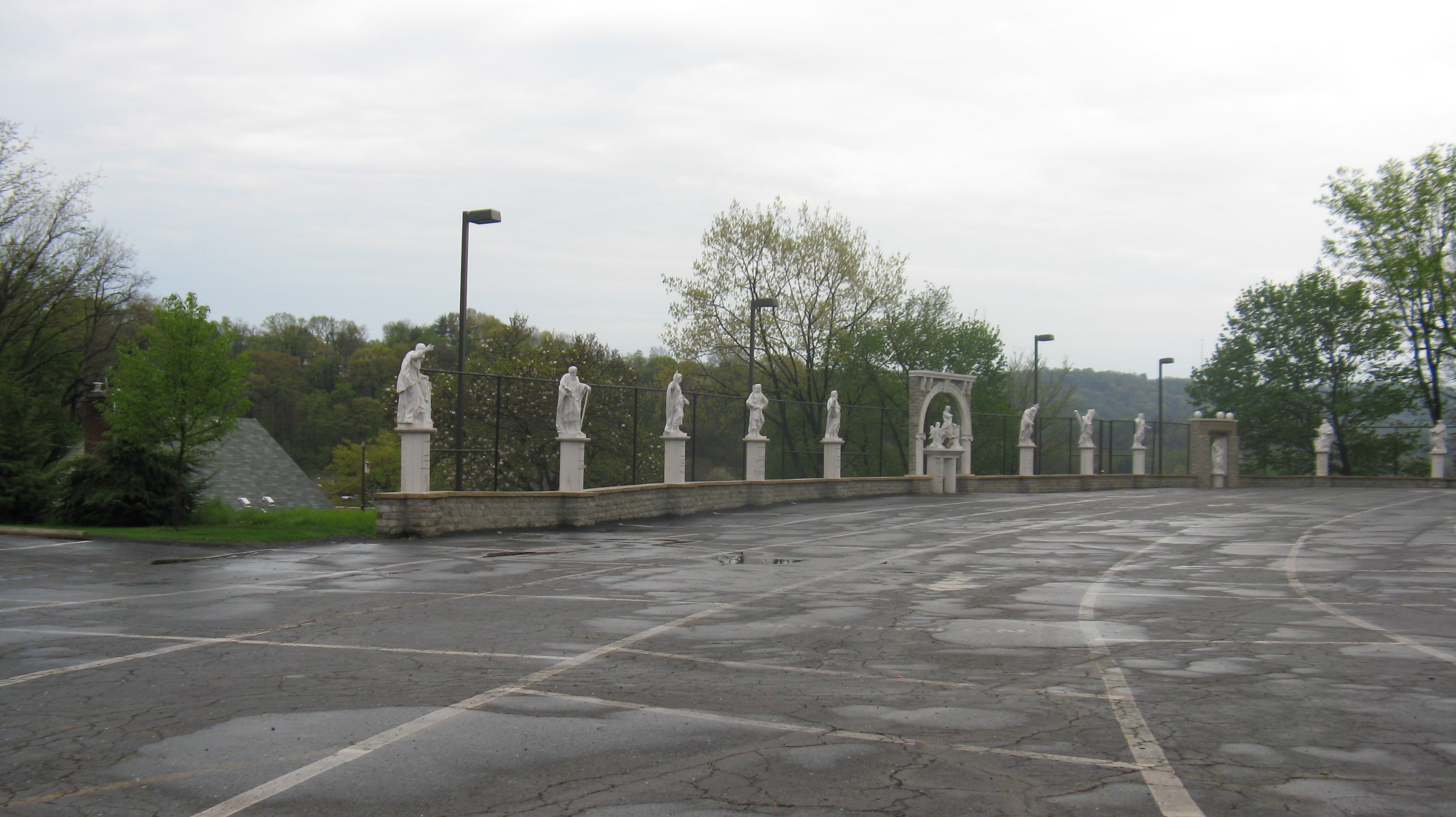
The back parking lot of the church and school where marble statues memorialize deceased parishioners

Mount Saint Peter Church was magnificent and rose up on the hill, but to many, it seemed as if it could not really belong to the congregation. It was much richer than Saint Peter Church and if it had not been labored upon by so many members of the congregation, none would have felt worthy to call it their parish. But since so much work, love, and faith had been spent on this place of worship, parishioners became proud to have the honor of attending Mass there every Sunday. As a construction site, it had held some dangers. On September 28, 1941, a group of teenage boys, just out of high school, were making concrete flooring for the church at the Burrell Construction Company. A large crane operating above them made an unusual movement, causing its bucket, which weighed several tons, to come down with a huge crash right in their midst. All the working tools were completely destroyed but none of the boys were hurt. The bronze door at the front entrance fell on a worker, and everyone believed he had been crushed to death. When ten men lifted the door, they found the worker unharmed underneath it. In another case, an 18-year-old was assigned a job on the tower of the church before it was roofed. No one realized that he had poor eyesight and he fell from the tower while working. On his way down, he was able to grab onto a pulley that was suspended from the tower.

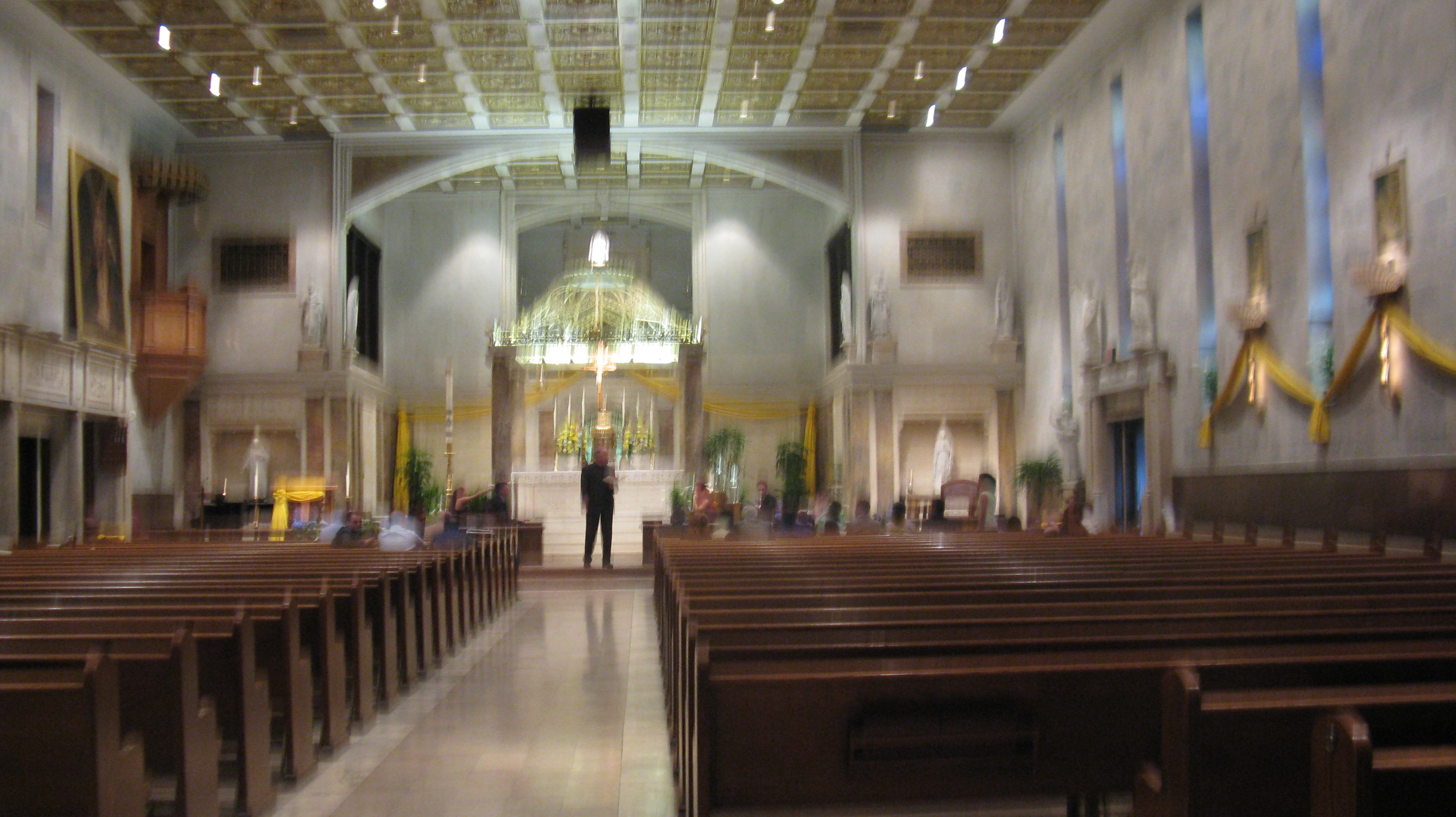
Inside of the church

Although much time has passed since the completion of the church and although the majority of those who helped to build it have passed on, Mt. St. Peter Church still stands as a Catholic church located at 100 Freeport Road in New Kensington, Pennsylvania. The church is located along the Allegheny River and is approximately 25 miles (40 km) north-east of the city of Pittsburgh. It is a member of the Diocese of Greensburg. The congregation was founded by Italian immigrants in the early 1900s and the building that now stands as Mt. St. Peter Church was built by its members. In 1998, the building applied for inclusion on the National Register of Historic Places as part of a Multiple Property listing that included several properties in New Kensington.

== Additions to the church ==
=== The Marble Hall ===
The Marble Hall is the basement of Mt. St. Peter's and is 125 by 55 feet (38 by 17 m). Before the church had been completed, this area had been filled with valuable material from the Mellon Mansion until the materials found their proper places in the upstairs of the church. By winter of 1944, the basement was completely empty. During this time, there were men working on building the Rectory, but since there was much snow, they could not return to their work on the Rectory until spring. Nicholas Givens had donated a large quantity of marble for the basement, so they began work on the basement. The workers covered the ground with black asphalt tile and the walls and pillars with white Carrara marble. Two marble altars were constructed along with a large kitchen built to feed up to 400 people. They also built a furnace room and a large workshop to the side of the kitchen.

When work on the Marble Hall was being done, from 1944 to 1948, the assistant pastor of Mount St. Peter's was Father George Goralka, who executed an inscription around the central nave of the ceiling of the Marble Hall, Christ's proclamation of Peter's Primacy: "Blessed art thou Simon Son of Jona and I say to thee, thou art Peter and upon this Rock I will build my Church and the gates of Hell shall not prevail against it, and I will give thee the keys of the Kingdom of Heaven and whatever thou shall bind on earth shall be bound in Heaven and whatever thou shall loose on earth shall be loosed in Heaven." The basement was called the Marble Hall after completion and the name stuck. The Marble Hall is mostly used for special breakfasts and dinners, and for fish fry fundraisers during Lent. The hall also serves as the parish's Italian Restaurant during the Festa Italiana each August. On special holidays when more parishioners than usual attend Mass, which usually include Christmas, Palm Sunday, and Easter, the Mass is said in both the upstairs of the church and downstairs in the Marble Hall.

=== The rectory ===
According to the Council of Trent, every Catholic church is required to have a residing pastor. Before the building of the rectory began in 1944, the three priests and their housekeeper had lived in the Leslie Mansion (the mansion on the property). The mansion was over a hundred years old, was a frame building, had very few rooms, provided poor living conditions, and had a water pump at the main entrance.

Therefore, the parish was in desperate need of a new rectory and the new project was begun in 1944. An engineer, Frank H. Recco, was the technical advisor of the project. Parishioners borrowed a bulldozer from the John F. Casey Company in Aspinwall, and a steam shovel from the Burrell Construction and Supply Company of New Kensington; and they dug the foundation for a two-level building.

Cinder blocks were purchased for eight cents each. Flexicore slabs were made by young men of the parish on the grounds of the Burrell Construction Company and also at Mt. St. Peter's. They were made under the direction of Charles Cammarata, who was assisted by the General Electric Co. The slabs, once completed, were used to make the floors and roof. John Stanish gathered free flexicore forms from Dayton, Ohio, free cement from the Burrell Construction Company, and free bricks from an abandoned brick-yard in New Kensington.

The three-story rectory took three years to complete. On the first floor, there is a dining room, a breakfast room, a kitchen, a pantry, space for archives, a laundry room, and a three car garage. There are four separate stairways that lead up to the second floor. The second floor has three offices, a community room, a large library, and a spacious veranda. In the hallway, there is a large stained glass window made in Germany, but repurposed from the Mellon Mansion. The third floor can be reached from either of two stairwells. The floor has ten rooms divided into four apartments and two guestrooms. This floor also has an open veranda.

In addition, the house has nine bathrooms and one elevator, which were taken from the Mellon Mansion. Also taken from the Mellon Mansion were two fireplaces. The one was carved in Italy from lava of Mount Vesuvius and is located in the community room. The other, located in the dining room on the first floor, was carved out of red Michigan sandstone by an Italian-American sculptor.

=== The Mount Saint Peter Oval ===
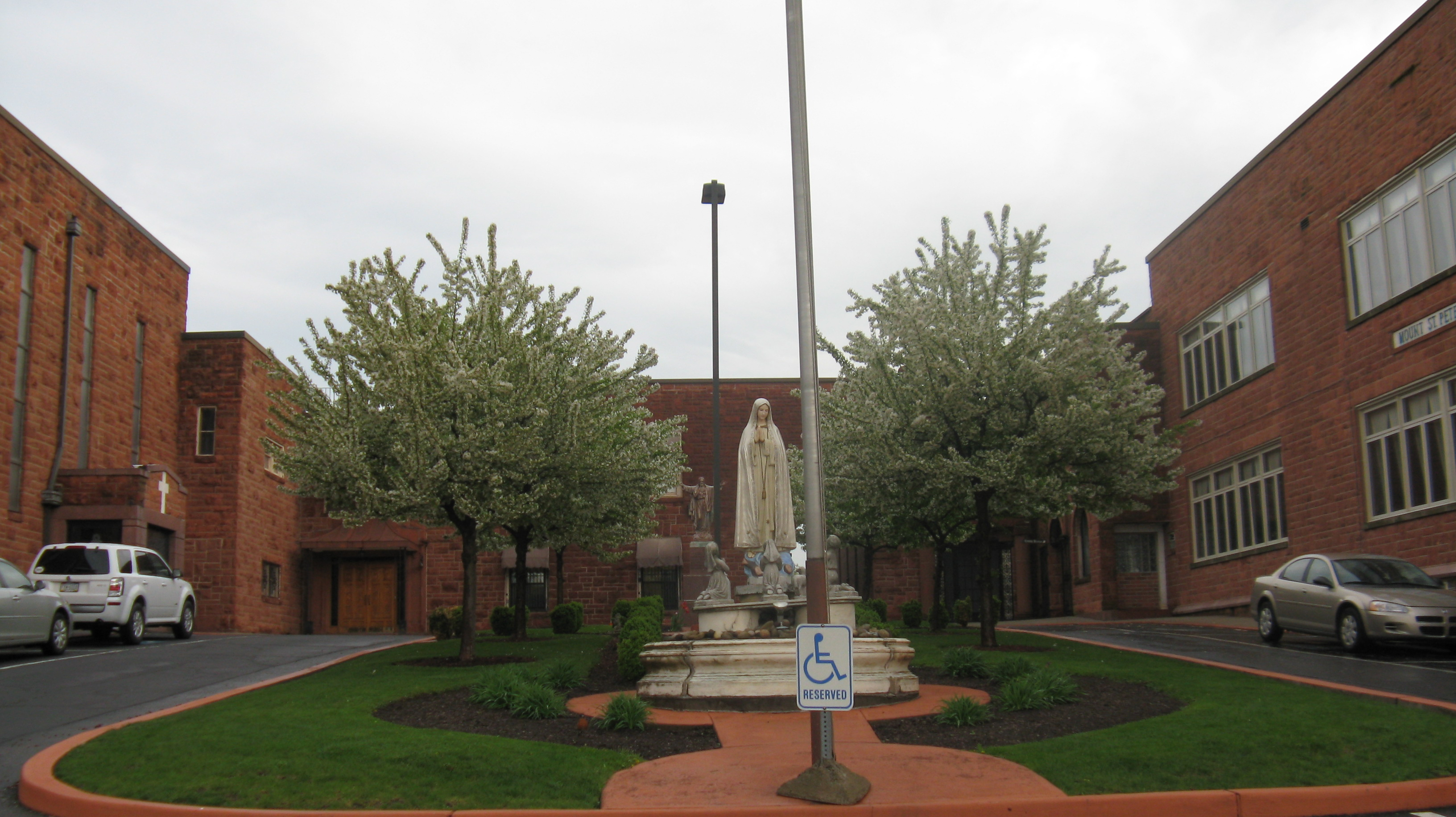
The Mount Saint Peter Oval

Once the church and rectory had been completed, the workers began to envision a plaza. The area that was to become the oval was still occupied by the mansion that was on the Mt. St. Peter grounds. With the permission of the Chancery Office of the Diocese of Pittsburgh, the mansion was demolished and only a few of the fixtures were removed by the church prior to the demolition.

A 10-foot (3.0 m) wide road was built around the area that was to become the oval. John Stanish decided to have the oval paved with small pieces marble. He collected the marble remaining from the building of the church along with other pieces. The pieces were all different types, colors, and sizes. Mr. Stanish instructed John Martorana to lay them.

Martorana placed the pieces of marble in a way that looked artistic. In 1947, a pedestal of granite taken from the Mellon Mansion was erected on the northern end of the oval. On top of it was placed a life-size bronze statue of Christ with open arms. On Armistice Day, November 11, 1951, the monument was dedicated to the defenders of the United States.

A high flying flagpole was presented to the oval by Alcoa. The American flag was hoisted on it for the first time by Joseph Iozzi, who was a disabled veteran of World War II. Nearly all of the fraternal organizations of the New Kensington community were represented at the dedication ceremony. The Reverend Monsignor Giustino Meniconzi, who was the Vicar-General of the Diocese of Ferentino, Italy, blessed the statue of Christ and the American flag.

=== Convent school ===
The next thing built on the grounds was an eight foot arch that went from the rectory to the next future building. A statue of Saint Peter was placed in the niche over the keystone of the arch. From the arch, a large stairway descends to the lower level of the grounds.

For two years, from 1948 to 1950, work was done on the new building connected to the rectory by the arch. The three-story building was made of flexicore slab and the outside was made from a mixture of new and old bricks in the back and Michigan red sandstone in the front, so that the building was the same color as the buildings to which it was adjoined. The interior of the building was plastered by one of the best plasterers in the area, Dom Graziano, who was the son of a parishioner. He did all of the plastering for free.

When the building was finished, it had two classrooms, a kitchen, a laundry room, a pantry, and a main entrance on the first floor. On the second floor, there were three classrooms and a chapel with an adjoining sacristy. The third floor was a living area for the teaching sisters. It had eight cells, a kitchen, a refectory, and a community room. All in all, the building was a permanent convent and a temporary parochial school.

=== Parochial school ===
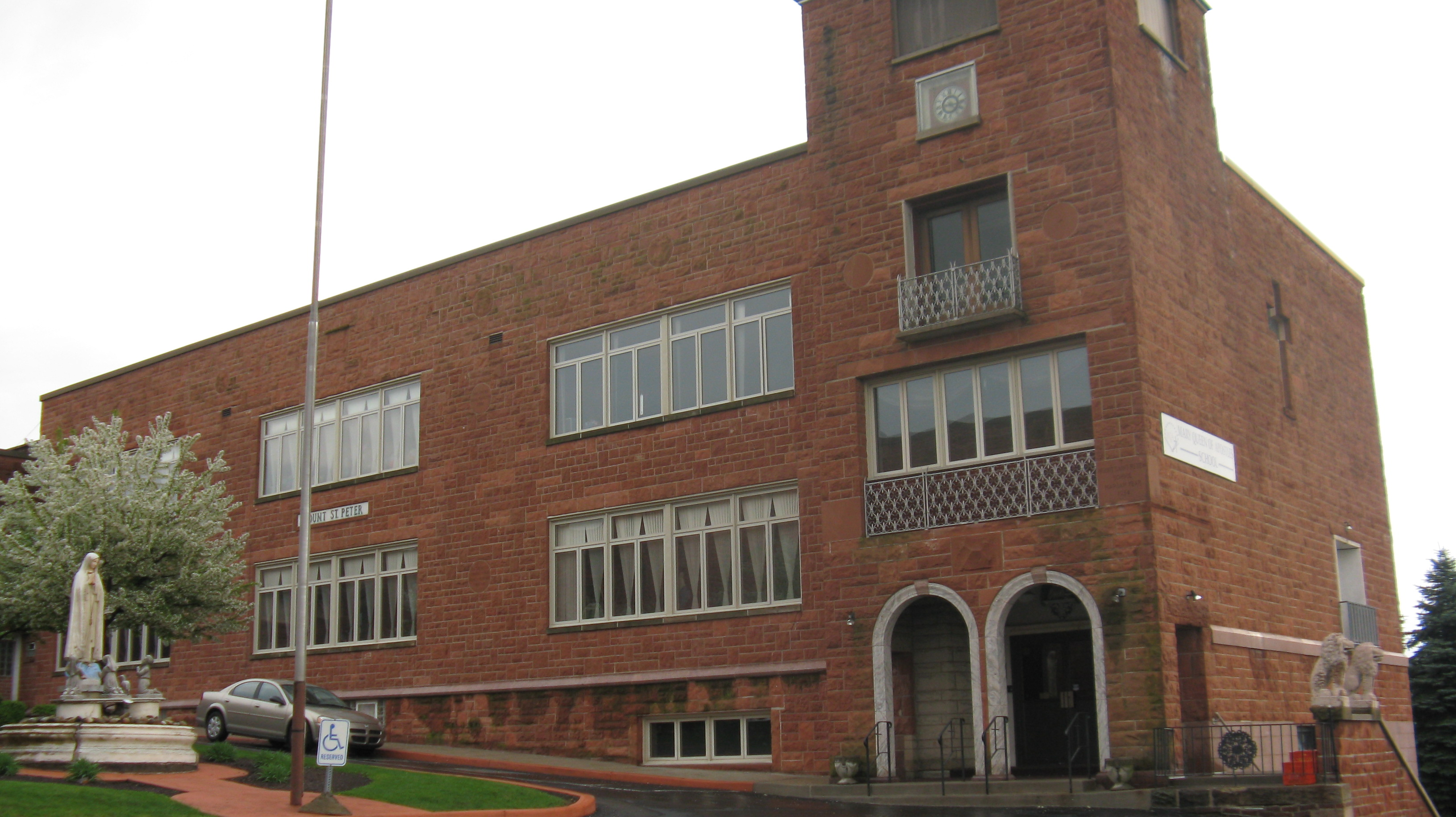
Mount St. Peter School

Since the convent school was small and only temporary, the next order of business was to build the actual school. The parochial school took ten years to build (1950–1960). This building also consists of three floors and is covered with red sandstone in the front. The rear of the building is made of white Pennsylvania sandstone. There is a bell tower on the building. It has three heavy, bronze bells that were salvaged from three Protestant churches of Pittsburgh.

The walls of the building are faced with blue tiles from Kittanning. Mr. Clifford McNees, who was the president of the Kittanning Tile and Brick Company at the time when Mt. St. Peter bought the tile, sold the tiles for a lot cheaper than normal price. He felt that it would not be fair to take advantage of a church by charging high prices. Another man who helped save the parish money in the constructing of the school was parishioner Luigi Valle. He advised the workers on how to set the tiles for many days while refusing to be paid for his services. Valle died in his early 40s, before the tile laying was completed. His place was taken by Bruno Regoli and two of his sons, Bruno, Jr. and John. (John would later become a priest of Mt. St. Peter Parish.) The three men faced the entire third floor with tile, a job that took them more than a month to complete.

Two huge granite lions, taken from the gardens of the Mellon Mansion, stand guard at the main entrance of the school and the door is surmounted with a terracotta Madonna by Della Robbia. In the school, there are nine classrooms, two auditoriums, a library, a cafeteria, and a utility kitchen. When the school was completed in 1960, it opened for children in grades 1–8. Later on, a kindergarten and preschool were added.

In September 2002, Mount Saint Peter School no longer stood alone but rather became part of Mary Queen of Apostles School. The new school resulted from the consolidation of Mount Saint Peter, Saint Joseph, and Saint Margaret Mary Schools. Now, the school at Mt. St. Peter's now educates children in preschool through third grade.

== Pastors of Mt. St. Peter ==
Mount Saint Peter's Parish Pastors
Appointment	Name
1902	Fr. Bonaventure Piscopo
1903	Fr Vincenzo Masselli
1903	Fr. Joseph DiSabato
1905 – 1906	Fr. Charles Galassi
1907	Father F. Pozukanis Father L. Pastorius; Father H. Duval
1914	Father Fortunato Sacchi
1915	Father James Vocca
1923	Monsignor Nicola Fusco
1968	Father Francis L. Ginocchi
1983	Father Leonard T. Sanesi
1992	Father Richard G. Curci
2005	Monsignor Michael Begolly

The pastor of Mt. St. Peter Parish is appointed to the position by the Bishop and is the leader of the parish. When one steps down, is transferred to another church, passes away, or retires, another is appointed. He is in charge of making sure that everything goes smoothly with the priests and administration of the church. The pastor works in collaboration with the Parish Staff, the Parish Pastoral Council, and the Parish Finance Council. His mission is to proclaim and help facilitate the building of the Kingdom of God among the parishioners of Mt. St. Peter Church.

== Congregation in the 21st century ==
As of 2009, the congregation had approximately five thousand two hundred and nine parishioners. The church's new motto, adopted in 2004, is: "to restore all things in Christ...with the fire of love."

Mass is said at 8:30 am everyday from Monday to Friday and at 4:00 pm on Saturday evenings. Sunday Masses are said weekly at 8:30 and 10:30 am.

=== Festa Italiana ===
As part of its continuing mission, the congregation sponsors an annual Festa Italiana every August. The festival itself is full of activities, but one of the main attractions is the food. The menu usually includes lasagna with homemade noodles, spaghetti and meatballs, hot sausage sandwich with onions and peppers, pasta e fagiole, Italian rice balls, and other items such as pulled pork and baked chicken. Desserts include cannoli, frappe, pizelles, biscotti and gelato One parishioner explained, "I like seeing everyone from town, but the food is always an attraction."

=== Parish organizations ===
The organizations listed are the ones that are currently active, there were in the past, many others, like the Committee of a hundred (mentioned in the history section), which are no longer in existence.

==== Addolorata Society ====
Some of their events include attending funeral Masses and collecting money to purchase altar linens, vestments, and altar lights. The presidents of the society since 1903 in chronological order are as follows: Mrs. Rose Spinelli, Mrs. Michelina Fragale, Mrs. Maria Greco, Mrs. Rose Pascuzzi, Mrs. Santa Bordonaro, Mrs. Anna Bordonaro, Mrs. Sabetta, Mrs. Carmina Chirella, Georgeanne Stearman, and Sandy Laney.

==== Saint Anthony Guild ====
In 1939, Mrs. Angela Costanza Bongiovanni, along with the help of Monsignor Fusco, founded the Saint Anthony Guild. At that time, 32 women joined Mrs. Bongiovanni's new guild. The mission of the guild was to serve the special needs of the parish and to help the poor and disadvantaged in the area. Also, the guild volunteered its time and effort at the St. Anthony Orphanage in Oakmont, hence the name "Saint Anthony Guild". All the members of the Saint Anthony Guild are women and they strive to provide their group with fellowship and spiritual renewal through the help the bestow on the church and community.

As of 2010, there are 47 active members of the organization and the president is Suzette Venturini. The group meets on the third Tuesday of February, April, May, August, September, October and November in the Marble Hall of Mt. St. Peter Church. The meetings consist of discussing projects and praying together. The St. Anthony Guild is known for their visits to the home-bound of the parish at Christmas and Easter and also for their Tree of Angels Campaign. This campaign allows parishioners to purchase angels in memory of loved ones that are placed on the church's Christmas tree. The money raised from these angel ornaments is donated to children in need. The guild also has many entertaining fundraisers to raise money for their charity projects. Some of these include a dance for parishioners in the fall, bingo nights, and selling coupons for special shopping days at Macy's.

==== Altar servers ====
Altar servers wear long, white, plain robes and assist the priest in his duties during the Mass. At Mt. St. Peter Church, there are four altar servers at every Mass. One is the book bearer and is in charge of bringing the Bible to the priest at the times during which the priest reads from the Bible during the Mass. The cross bearer holds a large, wooded crucifix and commences the procession in which the priest enters the church. Also present in the procession are the acolytes, and the book bearer. He or she also leads the procession out of the church at the end of the Mass. The last two altar servers are acolytes and are in charge of lighting the candles in the church prior to the beginning of the Mass and extinguishing them after Mass.

==== Confraternity of Christian Doctrine ====
Members of the confraternity serve as teachers in the Sunday Schools of the parish (there are seven different Sunday Schools belonging to Mt. St. Peter's in total). The majority of children who attend one of the Sunday Schools are ages 6–12.

==== Holy Name Society ====
Members of the society host a Mass and breakfast on the Sunday prior to Palm Sunday every year and an annual Golf Outing during the summer. Money raised at these two events is donated to the parish to help aid in the costs of parish projects.

==== Ushers' Club ====
The Ushers' Club consists of thirty or less men of the parish. They are chosen to join the club by the authority of the church. All members are required to do their job as "ushers" during Mass. This job entails showing people to available seats, telling parishioners when it is the right time to rise and get in line for communion, and collecting the monetary offerings of the parishioners during the presenting of the gifts to the altar. Members of the Ushers' Club also serve the church by volunteering their time and labor at the social activities of the parish.

==== St. Vincent De Paul Society ====
Mt. St. Peter Parish has a branch of the Saint Vincent De Paul Society. The goal of this branch of the society, like all other branches, is to help the poor, the sick, and the suffering. Members of this group work to help people locally by collecting food and delivering it to food banks in and around New Kensington.

==== Mount Saint Peter Parish Council ====
In March 1972, the Mount Saint Peter Parish Council was first elected. The group consists of eighteen elected members and it advises and assists the pastor in important decisions concerning the affairs of the church. The main purpose of the council is to give the pastor an insight into what the parish community thinks and how it feels about different issues. All of the parish activities must go through the four standing committees, which are the Liturgy, Education, Apostolic Work, and Temporalities.
