= Carmen Gentile =

American journalist

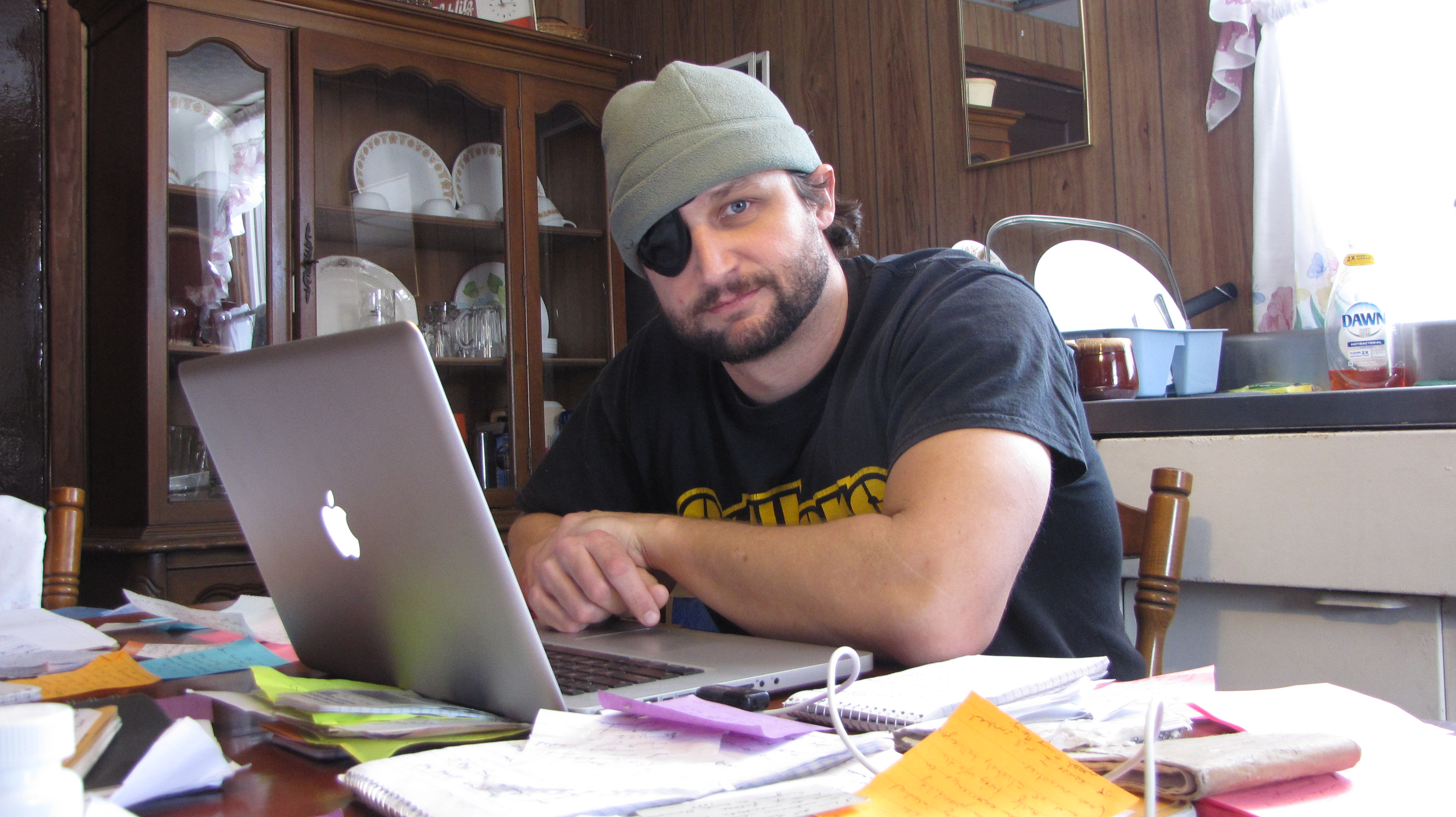
- Born: June 21, 1974 (age 52); New Kensington, Pennsylvania, U.S.
- Education: Villanova University
- Occupations: Journalist, author
- Years active: 1996–present
- Known for: Blindsided by the Taliban
- Website: www.carmengentile.com

Carmen Gentile (born June 21, 1974) is an American journalist, author and public speaker who specializes in reporting on conflicts and the developing world. He is the author of the memoir Blindsided by the Taliban, a dark-humored retelling of his unusual injury in Afghanistan while embedded with American troops near the Pakistani border. In September 2010, Gentile was shot in the side of the head with a rocket-propelled grenade that did not detonate, although it blinded him in his right eye and crushed part of his skull.

== Background ==
Gentile was born in New Kensington, Pennsylvania, and attended Shadyside Academy. He graduated from Villanova University with a degree in philosophy and Islamic studies.

== Events of Blindsided by the Taliban ==
On September 9, 2010, Gentile was walking through a remote village in mountainous, eastern Afghanistan in the company of American and Afghan troops. While reporting for CBS - Gentile was a freelance radio reporter who also occasionally contributed video - he was injured when an assailant fired a rocket-propelled grenade from a very short distance away. The ordnance struck Gentile in the side of the head, blinding him in his right eye and crushing bones in his cheek. The rocket then ricocheted off of Gentile and struck a young platoon leader, Lt. Derek Zotto, in the elbow.

Gentile managed to capture his highly unusual injury on video.

He underwent several surgeries including one at a U.S. military hospital at Bagram Airfield in Afghanistan. After numerous operations and months of rehabilitation, Gentile returned to Afghanistan and resumed front line reporting, which is chronicled in his critically acclaimed book Blindsided by the Taliban (2018).

Since its publication, Gentile has been featured on NBC Today CNN Sunday Morning, C-Span and other leading programs.

In November 2019, it was announced that George Marshall Ruge will direct the feature-film length adaptation of Blindsided by the Taliban.

== Awards ==
Gentile is the recipient of the Galloway Award, named for UPI combat correspondent and McClatchy Newspapers columnist Joseph Galloway, for a story in Salon that is excerpted from Blindsided by the Taliban and is said to be both "straight-forward and harrowing."

== Motorcycle storytelling ==
In recent years, Gentile has combined storytelling from places like Iraq with his passion for motorcycling, writing stories for publications like Motorcyclist and Postindustrial, the media outlet Gentile founded in 2018 covering the Rust Belt, Appalachia, and Postindustrial Communities around the world.

== Works ==
- Gentile, Carmen (March 6, 2018). Blindsided by the Taliban: A Journalist's Story of War, Trauma, Love, and Loss, Skyhorse Publishing.
