= Louie Pessolano =

American football player (1907–1983)

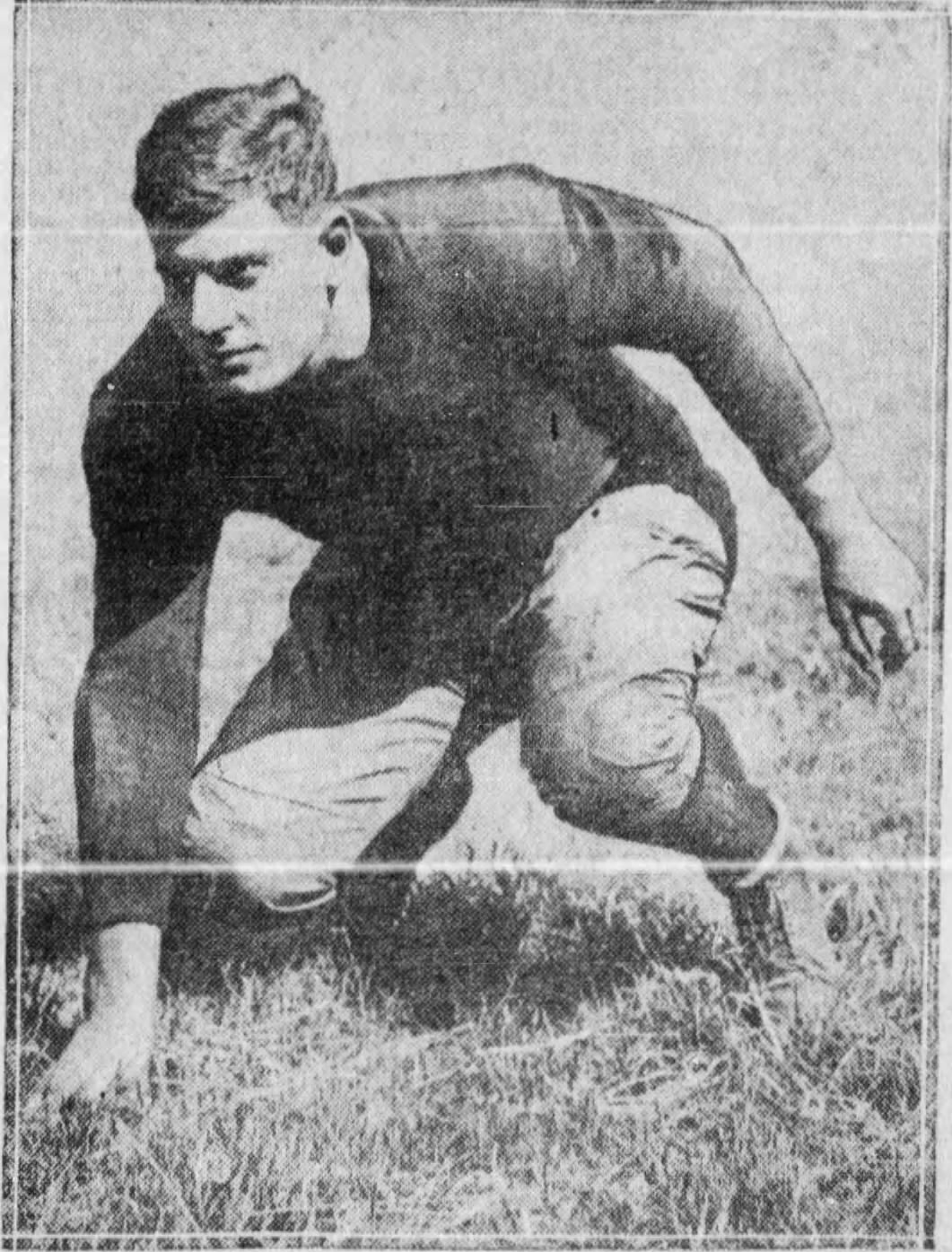
- Pessolano in 1928

No. 16
- Positions: Tackle, guard, end,

Personal information
- Born: February 23, 1907; New Kensington, Pennsylvania, U.S.
- Died: February 8, 1983 (aged 75); Augusta, Georgia, U.S.
- Listed height: 6 ft 0 in (1.83 m)
- Listed weight: 215 lb (98 kg)

Career information
- College: Villanova

Career history
- Staten Island Stapletons (1929)
- Stats at Pro Football Reference

Louis Carl Pessolano (February 23, 1907 – February 8 1983) was an American professional football player and actor who played in three games with the Staten Island Stapletons of the National Football League (NFL) in 1929.

Prior to playing professionally, Pessolano played high school football in New Kensington, Pennsylvania, where he was a team captain. After graduation, Pessolano played college football at Villanova University, where he was the team captain along with being the heaviest player on the team, weighing a reported 235 pounds.

After retiring from football, Pessolano turned to acting, where he appeared in various theater productions and the syndicated television show Miami Undercover. Pessolano also attended the Temple University School of Medicine and became a physician in Miami Springs, Florida.

In 1960, Pessolano testified in front of a federal court in Pennsylvania that he had unwittingly arranged to hire a plane which was used to send stolen weapons to Fidel Castro.

Later in life, Pessolano was caught up in the law on several occasions for performing illegal abortions. In 1962, Pessolano was arrested by authorities in Miami after performing a criminal abortion on a 16-year-old girl. Pessolano was later found guilty and was sentenced to three years in state prison. In 1963, Pessolano was charged with performing a criminal abortion on a 19-year-old women identified as the friend of a Miami police officer. Pessolano was found guilty of the crime and was sentenced to an additional five years in state prison. After failing on appeal to get his convictions reversed, Pessolano later had his combined sentences reduced to five years. Pessolano was released on parole after serving 13 months.
