= 7:11AM 11.20.1979 79°55′W 40°27′N =

Sculpture by Janet Zweig in Pittsburgh, United States

Coordinates: 40.453121°N 79.916821°W

7:11AM 11.20.1979 79°55'W 40°27'N is a 2010 public sculpture in light by Janet Zweig sited in Mellon Park in Pittsburgh, Pennsylvania, United States. It memorializes Ann Katharine Seamans, who died in a car crash when she was 20. Its title refers to the time and location of her birth.

== History ==
The artwork was commissioned by the Pittsburgh Parks Conservancy and the Pittsburgh Arts Council during a $775,000 renovation of the park's Walled Garden area. The installation measures 108 feet by 66 feet, features light via fiber optic cables and light sticks, and 150 granite markers with text.

This piece depicts stars and planets (150 in all) at the lawn-level of the garden, matching the exact sky over Pittsburgh at the 1979 birth of Ann Katharine Seamans (1979–1999), whom the installation memorializes. The title indicates that specific time, date, longitude, and latitude. Seamans was a Wesleyan University sophomore who died in a car crash; the site held significance for the Seamans family in remembering that Seamans and her friends "would sometimes lie on their backs in the walled garden and look up at the stars." Seamans was the daughter of Elizabeth Nadas Seamans, a filmmaker and script writer best known for her collaboration with Fred Rogers on Mister Rogers' Neighborhood, on which she appears as Mrs. McFeely.

The sculpture was dedicated on June 12, 2010.

== See also ==
- Pedestrian Drama
