= New Kensington Downtown Historic District =

Historic district in Pennsylvania, United States

- U.S. National Register of Historic Places
- U.S. Historic district
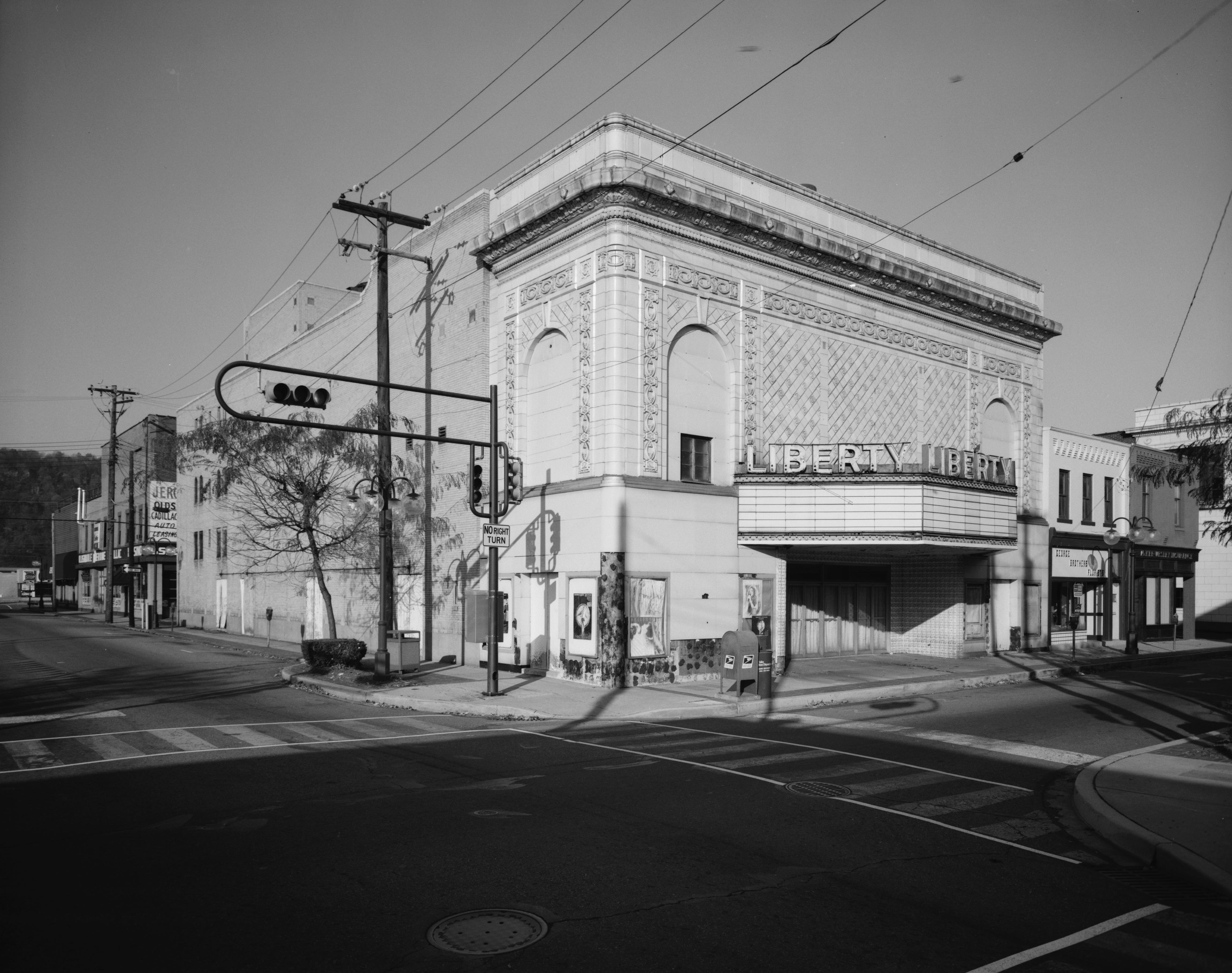
- Liberty Theater, HABS Photo

- Location within Pennsylvania Location within the United States
- Location: Roughly bounded by 8th Ave., 3rd St., 11th Ave., and Barnes Ave., New Kensington, Pennsylvania
- Coordinates: 40°33′58″N 79°45′58″W
- Area: 19.7 acres (8.0 ha)
- Built: 1891
- Architect: Geisey, James
- Architectural style: Colonial Revival, Art Deco, Beaux Arts
- MPS: Aluminum Industry Resources of Southwestern Pennsylvania MPS
- NRHP reference No.: 98000904
- Added to NRHP: July 23, 1998

The New Kensington Downtown Historic District, also known as the New Kensington Commercial and Residential Historic District, is a national historic district that is located in New Kensington, Westmoreland County, Pennsylvania.

It was added to the National Register of Historic Places in 1998.

== History and architectural features ==
This district encompasses 143 contributing buildings that are located in the central business district and surrounding residential areas of New Kensington. Built roughly between 1891 and 1947, they are a mix of residential, commercial, institutional, and industrial properties that were designed in a variety of popular architectural styles, including Art Deco, Beaux-Arts, and Colonial Revival. Notable buildings include the Mellon Bank Building (1900), the PNC Bank (1914), the Wear Ever Building (1914–1915), the U.S. Post Office (1933), the Ritz Theater (1921–1922), the Datola Theater (1942), the Columbus Theater (1927), and the White Castle Restaurant (c. 1921–1928).
