= New Kensington Production Works Historic District =

Historic district in Pennsylvania, United States

- U.S. National Register of Historic Places
- U.S. Historic district
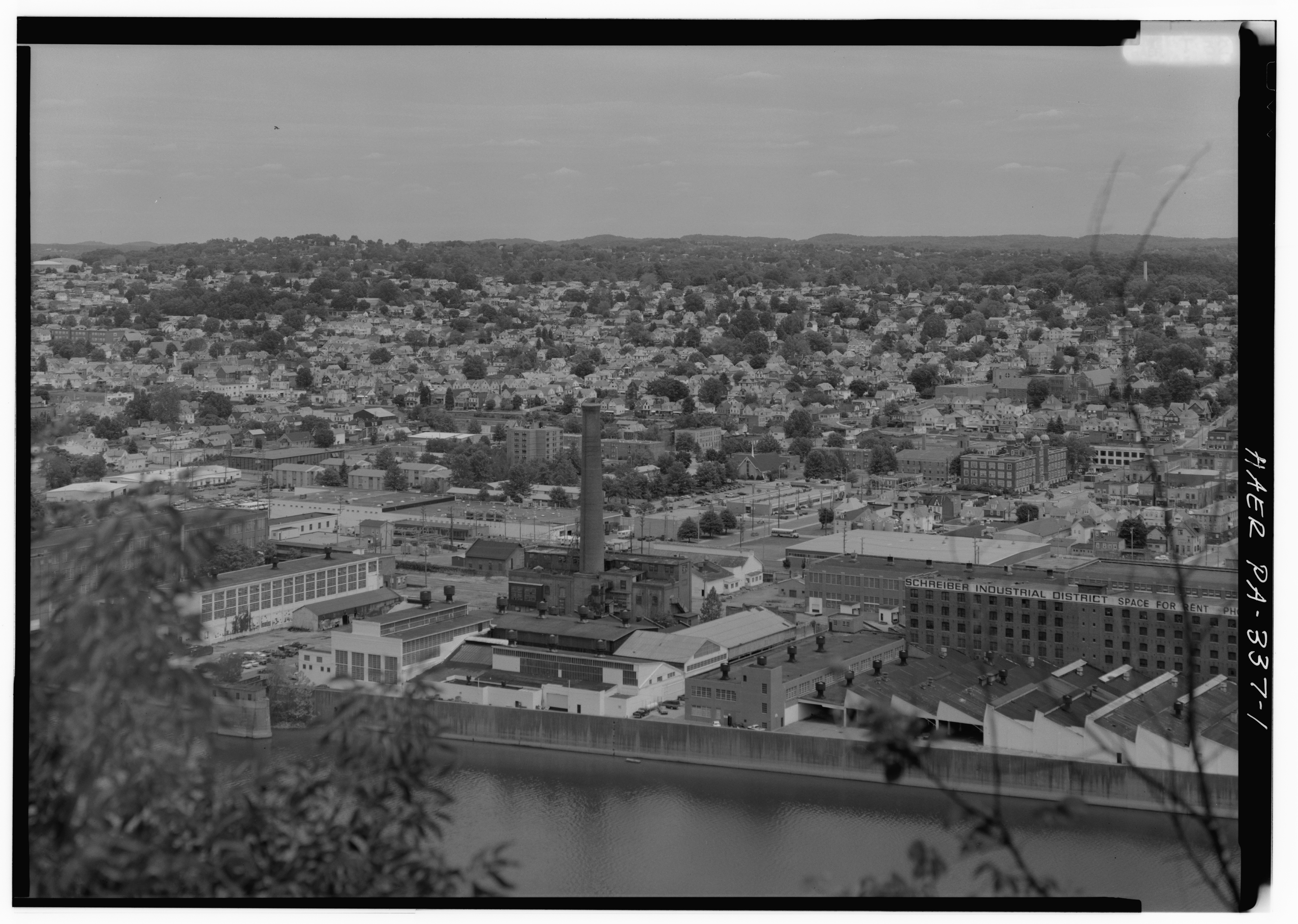
- Aerial view from 1989

- Location within Pennsylvania Location within the United States
- Location: Roughly along the Allegheny River, from Sixteenth St. to Seventh St., New Kensington, Pennsylvania
- Coordinates: 40°33′56″N 79°46′13″W
- Area: 60 acres (24 ha)
- Built: 1899
- MPS: Aluminum Industry Resources of Southwestern Pennsylvania MPS
- NRHP reference No.: 98000397
- Added to NRHP: May 7, 1998

The New Kensington Production Works Historic District, also known as the New Kensington Works and Arnold Works, is a national historic district that is located in New Kensington, Westmoreland County, Pennsylvania.

It was added to the National Register of Historic Places in 1998.

== History and architectural features ==
This district encompasses thirty-five contributing, vernacular, industrial buildings that were built roughly between 1899 and 1947, including the original manufacturing plant for Alcoa, which produced a wide range of aluminum products, such as kitchen utensils, rods, bars, wire, tubing, sheet foil, automobile parts, bronze powder, industrial chemical utensils, and beer barrels.
