= New Kensington, Pennsylvania =

City in Pennsylvania, US

- City
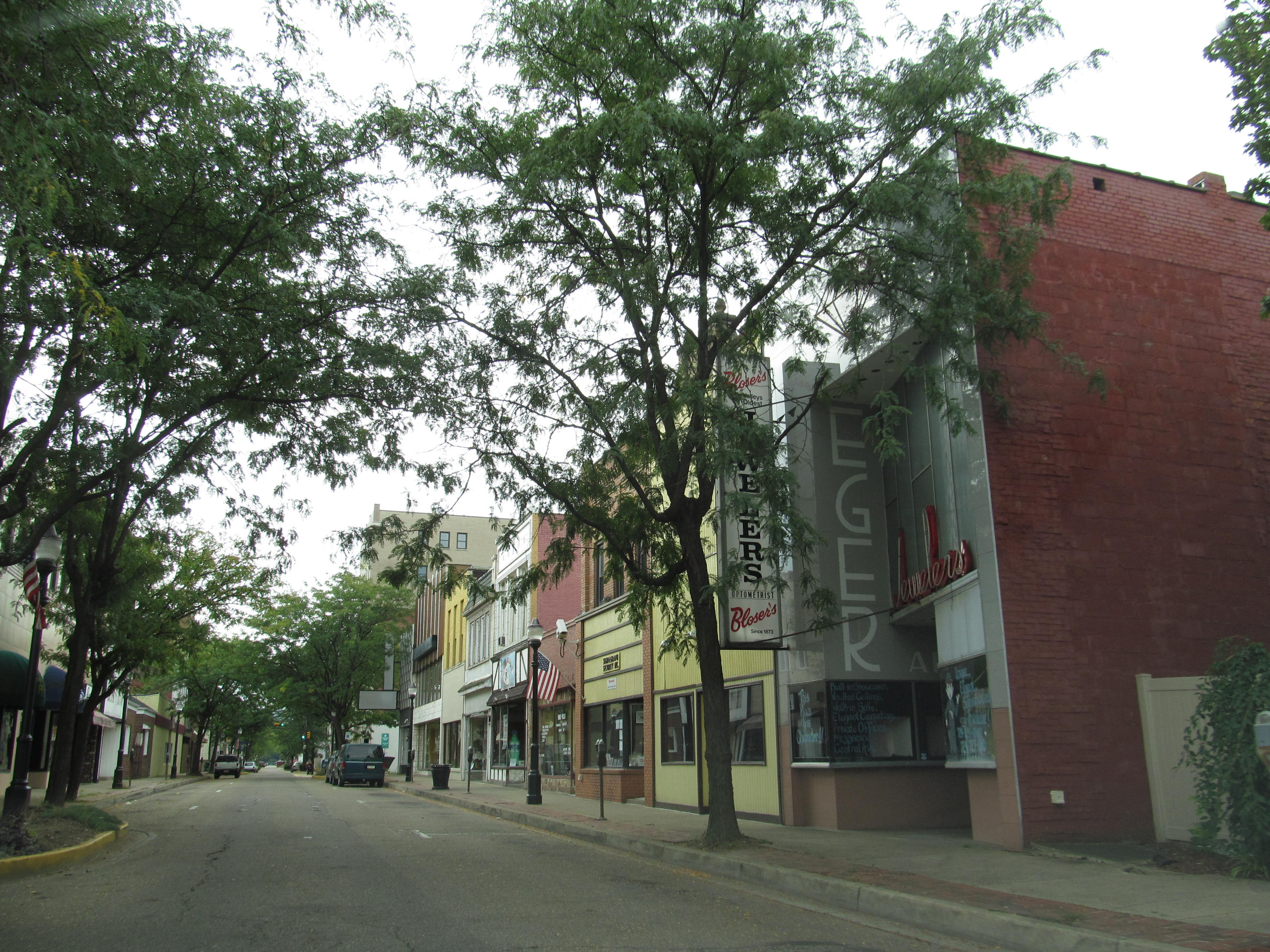
- Downtown New Kensington in 2012
- Interactive map of New Kensington, Pennsylvania
- Location within Pennsylvania Location within the United States
- Coordinates: 40°34′6″N 79°45′30″W
- Country: United States
- State: Pennsylvania
- County: Westmoreland
- Incorporated: Nov 26, 1892

Government
  - Mayor: Thomas D. Guzzo (D)

Area
  - Total: 4.26 sq mi (11.03 km^{2})
  - Land: 3.95 sq mi (10.23 km^{2})
  - Water: 0.31 sq mi (0.81 km^{2})
- Elevation: 1,110 ft (338.3 m)

Population (2020)
  - Total: 12,170
  - Density: 3,081.7/sq mi (1,189.84/km^{2})
- Time zone: UTC-5 (Eastern)
  - Summer (DST): UTC-4 (Eastern)
- ZIP code: 15068,15069
- Area codes: 724, 878
- FIPS code: 42-53736
- School district: New Kensington-Arnold
- Website: www.newkensingtonpa.org

New Kensington (known locally as New Ken) is a city in Westmoreland County, Pennsylvania, United States. The population was 12,170 at the 2020 census. It is situated along the Allegheny River 18 miles (29 km) northeast of Pittsburgh and is part of the Pittsburgh metropolitan area.

== History ==
Like much of Westmoreland County and surrounding areas, the region was a hunting ground for American Indians of the Six Nations. White settlement began in the mid-1700s. Continental army troops built Fort Crawford, near the mouth of Pucketa Creek, in 1777. The fort was abandoned in 1793.

Originally part of Burrell (and later Lower Burrell) Township, the city of New Kensington was founded in 1891. In 1890, the Burrell Improvement Company considered the advantages of the level land south of its home in Lower Burrell, and deemed it a prime location for a city and named the area "Kensington"; this was later changed to "New Kensington" for postal reasons, to avoid confusion with the Philadelphia neighborhood of the same name.

In an attempt to make New Kensington comparable to Pittsburgh, the streets were named with numbers. Avenues ran parallel to the river, while streets were perpendicular. The main commercial streets were 4th and 5th avenues.

Once the land was surveyed, a public sale was held on June 10, 1891. Thousands of people flooded the area and investors began bringing industry with them. The first large company was the Pittsburgh Reduction Company, which later became Alcoa. It acquired a 3.5-acre (14,000 m^{2}) property that allowed the company to utilize the riverfront. The Alcoa facility remained operational until 1971.

Eventually, other companies such as Adams Drilling, Goldsmith and Lowerburg, New Kensington Milling, New Kensington Brewing, Logan Lumber, Keystone Dairy, and many more were built late in the 19th century and continuing into the early 20th century. Early achievements included a railroad station, the 9th Street bridge, a passenger boat that navigated the Allegheny River, a street car line that ran to Natrona via the West Penn Railways, the Kensington Dispatch newspaper, a fire department, hotel, opera house, and a local chapter of the YMCA. New Kensington annexed the independent borough of Parnassus in 1939.

In 1941, New Kensington became the site of a modern workers' housing project—named the Aluminum City Terrace—designed by Marcel Breuer and Walter Gropius, which set new standards for federal housing design. Breuer and Gropius ascribed to the famous Bauhaus School of Design in Germany. Intended for Alcoa defense workers, it was subsequently used to rehouse displaced residents from other parts of the city. In 1948, tenants from the Terrace decided to purchase the housing project from the U.S. government to form a co-op, managed by a board of directors, elected by representatives from the 250 units. Relatively low-cost monthly fees continue to cover the costs of running the Terrace.

Today, New Kensington contains the neighborhoods of Parnassus, Mount Vernon, Valley Heights, Valley Camp, Pine Manor, and 40 Acres.

The New Kensington Downtown Historic District, New Kensington Production Works Historic District, and Mount St. Peter Roman Catholic Church are listed on the National Register of Historic Places.

== Climate ==
New Kensington has a humid continental climate (Köppen Dfa) climate, with cold, snowy winters, and warm to hot summers.

Climate data for New Kensington, Pennsylvania (Acmetonia Lock 3) 1991–2020 Normals (Temperature records 1978–Present, Precipitation 1905–Present)
Month	Jan	Feb	Mar	Apr	May	Jun	Jul	Aug	Sep	Oct	Nov	Dec	Year
Record high °F (°C)	67 (19)	75 (24)	79 (26)	87 (31)	94 (34)	97 (36)	101 (38)	96 (36)	95 (35)	89 (32)	74 (23)	67 (19)	101 (38)
Mean daily maximum °F (°C)	35.8 (2.1)	39.6 (4.2)	48.6 (9.2)	61.8 (16.6)	71.8 (22.1)	79.2 (26.2)	83.2 (28.4)	81.9 (27.7)	75.5 (24.2)	63.5 (17.5)	51.4 (10.8)	41.6 (5.3)	61.2 (16.2)
Daily mean °F (°C)	27.6 (−2.4)	30.3 (−0.9)	38.1 (3.4)	49.9 (9.9)	60.2 (15.7)	68.4 (20.2)	72.7 (22.6)	71.2 (21.8)	64.6 (18.1)	53.1 (11.7)	41.6 (5.3)	33.6 (0.9)	50.9 (10.5)
Mean daily minimum °F (°C)	19.4 (−7.0)	20.9 (−6.2)	27.5 (−2.5)	37.9 (3.3)	48.5 (9.2)	57.5 (14.2)	62.2 (16.8)	60.5 (15.8)	53.7 (12.1)	42.6 (5.9)	31.7 (−0.2)	25.5 (−3.6)	40.7 (4.8)
Record low °F (°C)	−6 (−21)	−9 (−23)	0 (−18)	20 (−7)	29 (−2)	40 (4)	49 (9)	39 (4)	39 (4)	30 (−1)	11 (−12)	0 (−18)	−9 (−23)
Average precipitation inches (mm)	3.38 (86)	2.87 (73)	3.68 (93)	3.70 (94)	3.91 (99)	4.45 (113)	4.54 (115)	3.56 (90)	4.18 (106)	3.32 (84)	3.26 (83)	3.66 (93)	44.51 (1,131)
Average precipitation days (≥ 0.01 in)	18	14	13	13	13	11	10	9	10	11	12	15	142
Source: NOAA

== Demographics ==
Historical population
Census	Pop.	Note	%±
1900	4,665		—
1910	7,707		65.2%
1920	11,987		55.5%
1930	16,762		39.8%
1940	24,055		43.5%
1950	25,146		4.5%
1960	23,485		−6.6%
1970	20,312		−13.5%
1980	17,660		−13.1%
1990	15,894		−10.0%
2000	14,701		−7.5%
2010	13,116		−10.8%
2020	12,170		−7.2%

=== 2020 census ===
As of the 2020 census, New Kensington had a population of 12,170. The median age was 47.7 years. 18.3% of residents were under the age of 18 and 23.3% of residents were 65 years of age or older. For every 100 females there were 93.1 males, and for every 100 females age 18 and over there were 90.5 males age 18 and over.

100.0% of residents lived in urban areas, while 0.0% lived in rural areas.

There were 5,755 households in New Kensington, of which 19.7% had children under the age of 18 living in them. Of all households, 35.9% were married-couple households, 21.9% were households with a male householder and no spouse or partner present, and 33.7% were households with a female householder and no spouse or partner present. About 38.4% of all households were made up of individuals and 17.7% had someone living alone who was 65 years of age or older.

There were 6,607 housing units, of which 12.9% were vacant. The homeowner vacancy rate was 2.3% and the rental vacancy rate was 9.7%.

Racial composition as of the 2020 census
Race	Number	Percent
White	9,474	77.8%
Black or African American	1,590	13.1%
American Indian and Alaska Native	22	0.2%
Asian	60	0.5%
Native Hawaiian and Other Pacific Islander	0	0.0%
Some other race	141	1.2%
Two or more races	883	7.3%
Hispanic or Latino (of any race)	340	2.8%

=== 2000 census ===
As of the 2000 census, there were 14,701 people, 6,519 households, and 3,963 families residing in the city. The population density was 3,703.9 inhabitants per square mile (1,430.1/km^{2}). There were 7,309 housing units at an average density of 1,841.5 per square mile (711.0/km^{2}). The racial makeup of the city was 87.85% White, 9.84% African American, 0.12% Native American, 0.23% Asian, 0.01% Pacific Islander, 0.37% from other races, and 1.58% from two or more races. Hispanic or Latino of any race were 0.72% of the population.

There were 6,519 households, out of which 23.8% had children under the age of 18 living with them, 44.3% were married couples living together, 12.9% had a female householder with no husband present, and 39.2% were non-families. 34.9% of all households were made up of individuals, and 17.3% had someone living alone who was 65 years of age or older. The average household size was 2.24 and the average family size was 2.90.

The population distribution by age was: 21.8% under the age of 18, 6.4% from 18 to 24, 26.7% from 25 to 44, 23.5% from 45 to 64, and 21.6% who were 65 years of age or older. The median age was 42 years. For every 100 females, there were 88.4 males. For every 100 females age 18 and over, there were 83.6 males.

The median income for a household in the city was $30,505, and the median income for a family was $37,952. Males had a median income of $32,692 versus $21,683 for females. The per capita income for the city was $16,152. About 8.5% of families and 13.7% of the population were below the poverty line, including 18.1% of those under age 18 and 11.9% of those age 65 or over.

== Infrastructure and organizations ==
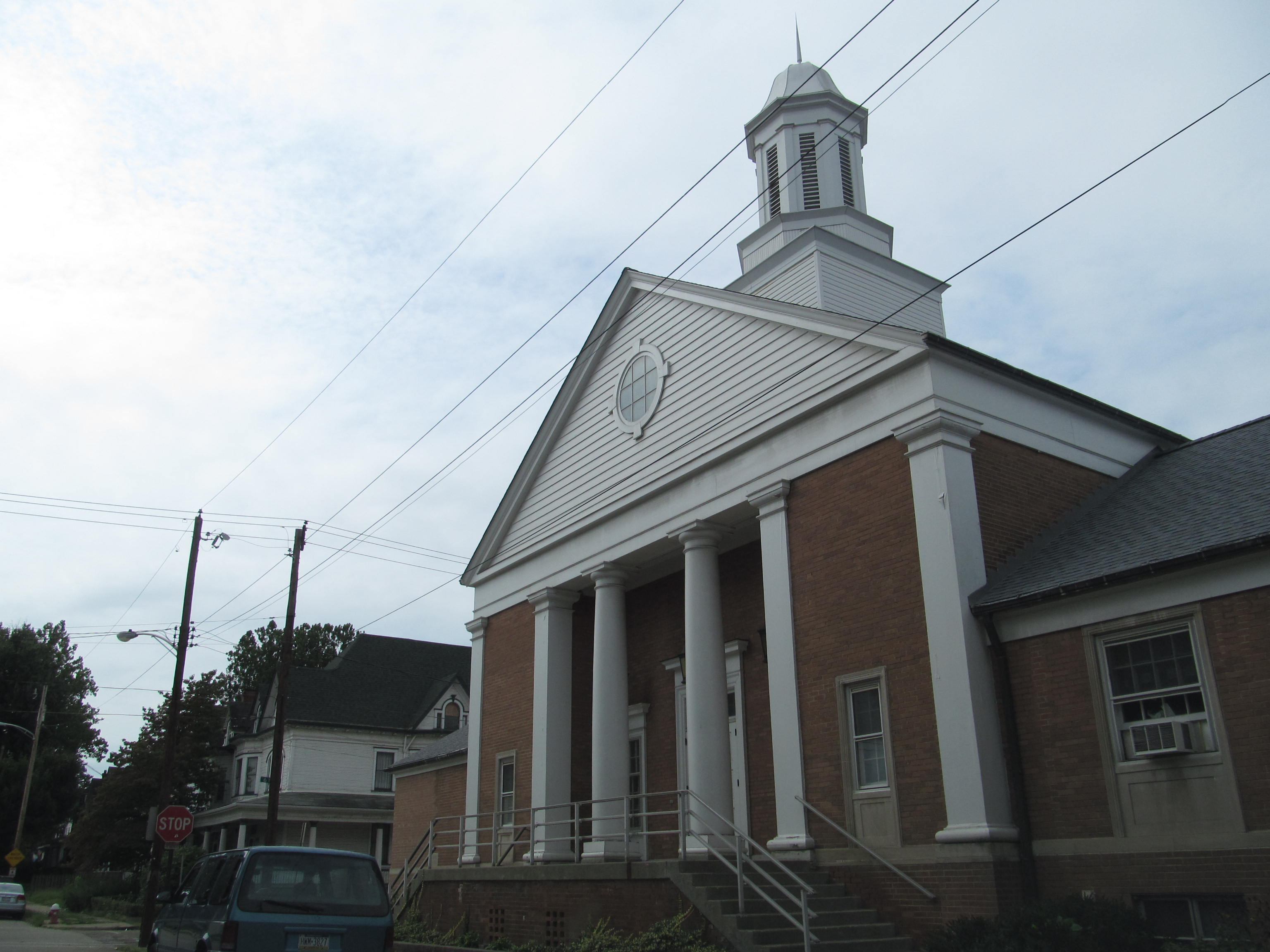
United Presbyterian Church Of New Kensington

New Kensington maintains its own public works, fire department, police force, emergency rescue team, and water authority. Recreational facilities operated by the city include Memorial and Masa Harbison parks. People's Library of New Kensington offers public library services. Public transportation is provided by the Port Authority of Allegheny County and Westmoreland County Transit Authority. The Westmoreland County Housing Authority administers the Kensington Manor, East Ken Manor, and Valley Manor public housing projects within the city limits.

There are over thirty churches representing several denominations throughout the city.

Two radio stations, WMNY and WBZZ, are both licensed to New Kensington, and serve the Pittsburgh radio media market.

Since the 1970s, the city's downtown has been plagued by high vacancy rates. Starting in 2008, the New Kensington Redevelopment Authority moved to condemn and demolish abandoned commercial and residential properties. The city has also instituted a Weed and Seed urban renewal program, and provided tax abatement to businesses located or opened in designated Keystone Opportunity Zones.

== Education ==
The city is served by the New Kensington–Arnold School District, with facilities at Valley High School, Valley Middle School, H. D. Berkey Intermediate School; and Greenwald Memorial, Fort Crawford, and Martin elementary schools. Budget shortfalls forced the closure of Greenwald Memorial and Fort Crawford in 2015. Valley Middle School was renamed Roy A Hunt Elementary. Greenwald Memorial, sold by the school district to the Roman Catholic diocese of Greensburg, became the new location of St. Josephs School.

Parochial schools include Mary Queen of Apostles and Harvest Baptist Academy (K–12). Former Catholic parochial schools, now consolidated, include: Mount St. Peter, St. Mary, and St. Joseph.

A branch campus of Pennsylvania State University was established in New Kensington in 1958. Since 1966, it has been located in suburban Upper Burrell Township, but retains the name Penn State New Kensington. In 2008, a satellite campus of Westmoreland County Community College opened in downtown New Kensington.

== In popular culture ==
New Kensington is featured in P.O.D.'s "Youth of the Nation" music video. The PA Route 56 Arnold directional sign is visible as the car in the video travels eastbound over the 9th Street Bridge, also known as the C.L. Schmitt Bridge.

The city was also one of the filming locations for the movie Dogma, starring Ben Affleck and Matt Damon.

The city is mentioned by name in the movie "13".

== Notable people ==
- Eddie Adams, photographer and photojournalist
- Orlando DiGirolamo, musician
- Anthony Breznican, journalist and writer
- Rachel Carson, marine biologist, writer, and conservationist
- Toney Clemons, former professional American football wide receiver
- Ray DiPalma, poet and visual artist
- Carmen Gentile, journalist, author, and public speaker
- Corey Graves, WWE commentator and former wrestler
- Jeffrey A. Hart, academic
- Stephanie Kwolek, chemist who is known for inventing Kevlar
- Lenita Lane, stage and film actress
- William Thomas McKinley, composer and jazz pianist
- Greg Meisner, former professional American football defensive lineman
- Skyy Moore, professional American football wide receiver for the San Francisco 49ers
- Elaine Noble, American politician and LGBT activist, Massachusetts House of Representatives
- Louie Pessolano, professional American football player
- Fannie Sellins, trade union and workers' rights leader
- Sam Tamburo, professional American football defensive end
- Willie Thrower, professional American football quarterback; first African American quarterback to be in the NFL in the modern era
- Charles Haskins Townsend, zoologist
- Andrea Velis, operatic tenor with the Metropolitan Opera
- Joe Zaleski, Canadian football player and coach

== Gallery ==
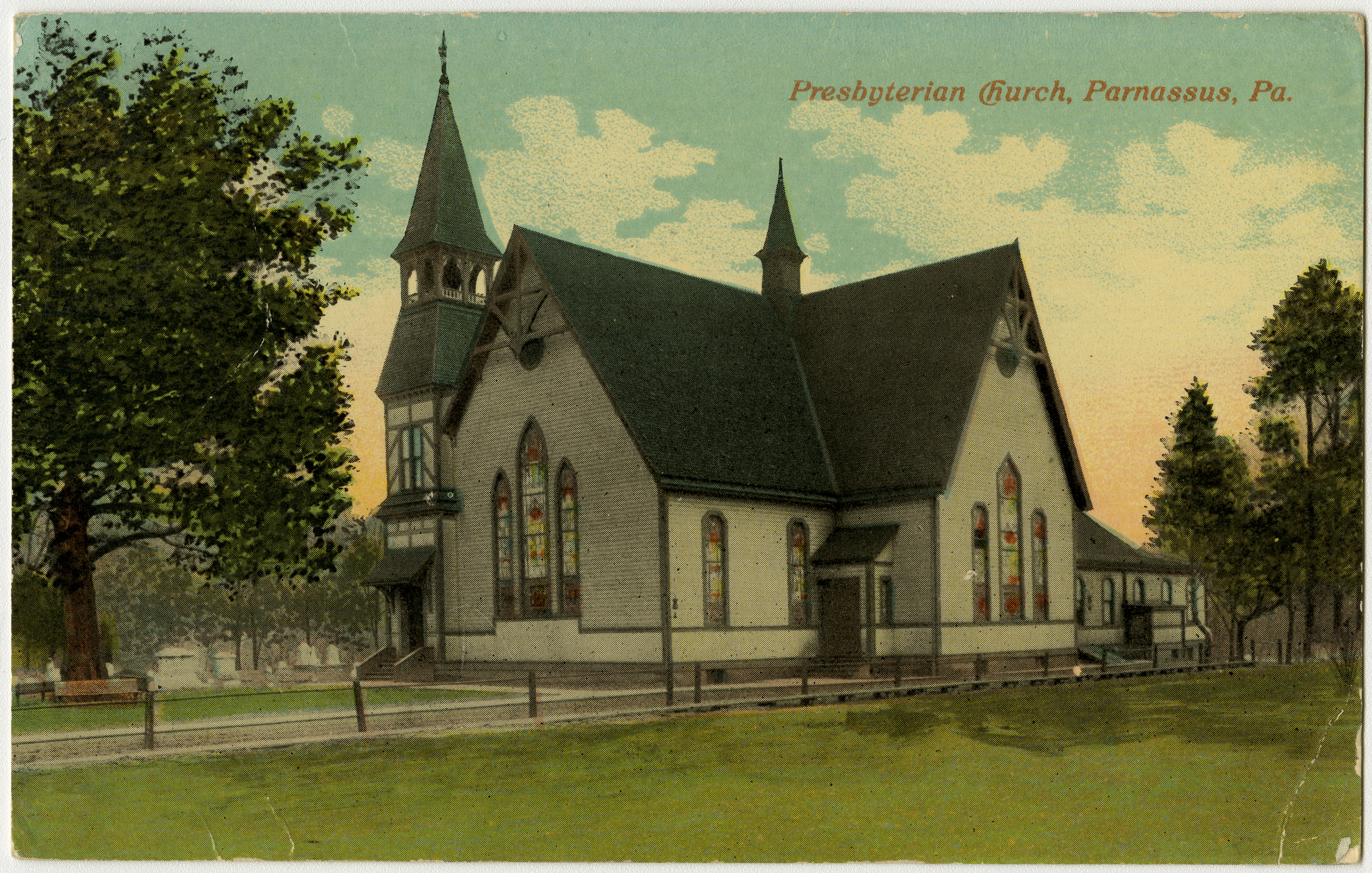
Parnassus Presbyterian Church on an old postcard

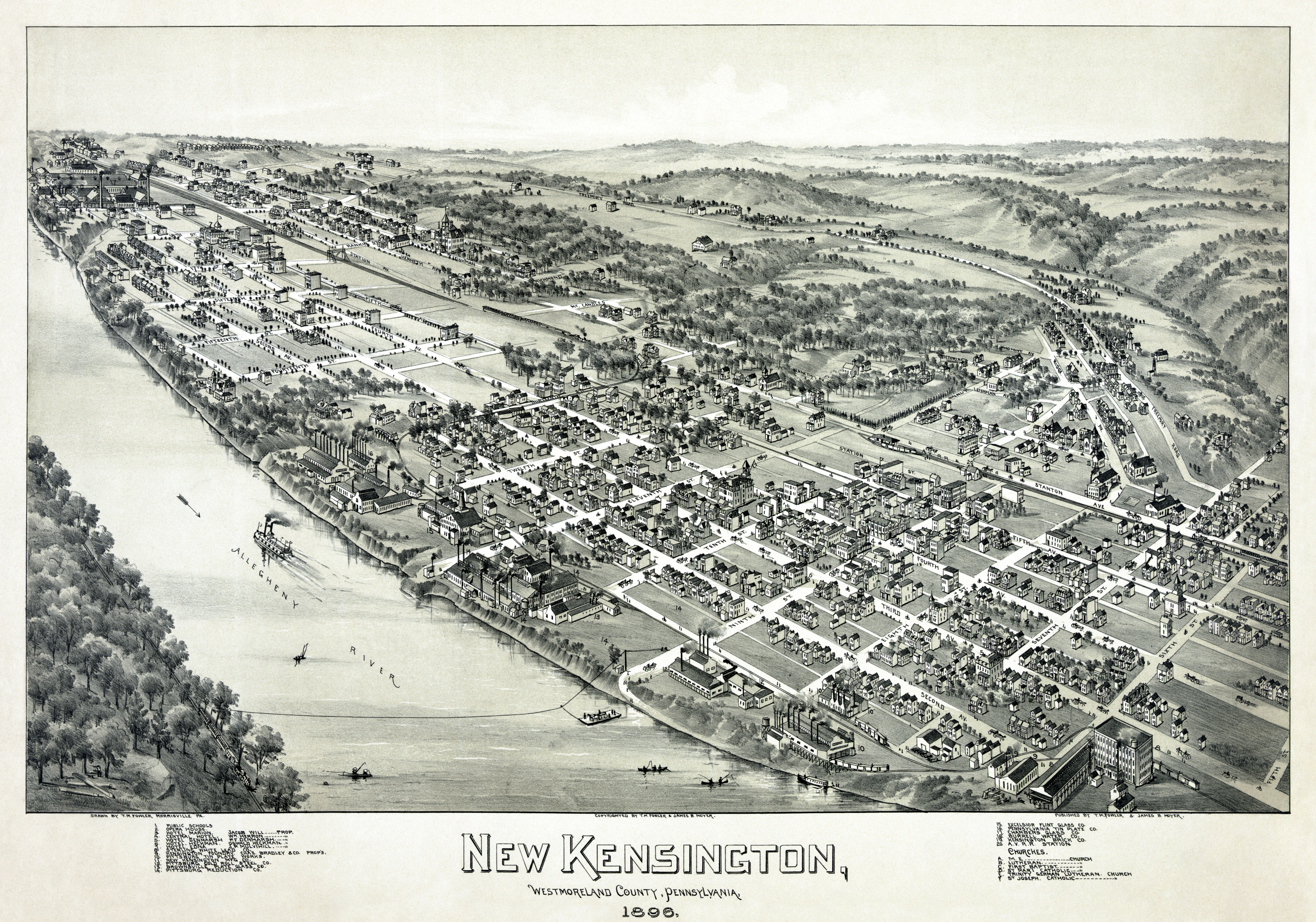
New Kensington in 1896, seen in a lithograph by Thaddeus Mortimer Fowler

== See also ==
- List of crossings of the Allegheny River
- Mount St. Peter Church
