= Janet Zweig =

American artist (born 1950)

- Born: 1950 (age 75–76); Milwaukee, Wisconsin, U.S.
- Education: Cornell University, Visual Studies Workshop
- Known for: Public art, installation, sculpture
- Notable work: Carrying On, Interimaginary Departures

Janet Zweig (born April 4, 1950) is an American artist whose work consists primarily of art in the public realm and computer-driven language-generating sculpture.

== Life and career ==
Janet Zweig was born in Milwaukee, WI, raised in Chicago, IL, and has lived in New York since 1994. Zweig received her BA from Cornell University and her MFA from The Visual Studies Workshop in Rochester, NY.

In the 1980s, she produced several editioned artist's books. In the late 1980s, she started to make computer-driven sculpture using printers and language-generating programs. After 1997, she began to work exclusively in the public realm.

A book about her early computer-based art, titled Recursive Apologies: Janet Zweig's Text Generating Sculpture was published by inventory Press in 2026.

She is currently a senior critic at the Rhode Island School of Design and was a lecturer at Brown University's Graduate Program in Public Humanities.

== Public commissions ==
Zweig has works in various public and private collections, however, her work is primarily public. Zweig's exhibits include the Brooklyn Museum of Art, Exit Art, PS1 Museum, Walker Art Center, and Cooper Union. Some of her public commissions include the following works:

Interimaginary Departures, Austin-Bergstrom International Airport, 2021. Commissioned by Austin Art in Public Places, Zweig created a boarding room for flights to 120 fictional locations. These locations were sourced from literature, gaming, science fiction, film, animation, and comics. There is a Flight Information Display board, an upcoming flight board, an interactive ticketing machine, and audio flight announcements.

In Common, Boston, September-October 2021, was a month-long temporary project on the Boston Common, commissioned by The Friends of The Public Garden and curated by Now+There. This participatory project used sculpture, light, and performance to explore ideas about ownership. Over the month, twelve Guides talked to visitors about common-pool resources, what they have in common with each other, and the Boston Common.

Columbus Never..., Columbus, OH, 2012-3. This was a temporary piece for the bicentennial of Columbus on a 66-ft wall across the street from the state house. The first five words of this generative sentence were written by the artist and installed in three parts every two weeks. Afterwards, a writing contest solicited three to five word entries from the residents of Columbus to continue the sentence. The winning entries were installed every two weeks during the bicentennial year of the city.

Lipstick Enigma, Orlando, FL, 2010. Made of 1200 resin lipsticks, and 1200 stepper motors, this computer-driven sentence-generator, using rules and lexicon written by the artist, invents and writes a new line of text, and displays it on the sign when triggered by a motion detector. The sentences mix the language of engineering with the language of beauty advertising. The piece was commissioned by The State of Florida Art in State Buildings Program for an engineering school at The University of Central Florida.

Prairie Logic, Kansas City, MO, 2012. Zweig created a full-scale boxcar and planted a prairie on a public rooftop in downtown Kansas City in collaboration with local architects, El Dorado. The boxcar doorway, when opened, becomes a proscenium stage for performances. Through local curation, events are programmed for the space.

Carrying On, New York, NY, 2004. Zweig collaborated with Edward Del Rosario on a steel, slate, and marble frieze installed in the Prince Street subway station in New York. This piece is part of the New York City Metropolitan Transit Authority’s collection.

7:11AM 11.20.1979 79°55'W 40°27'N, Pittsburgh, PA, 2009. Zweig was commissioned by the Pittsburgh Parks Conservancy to create a memorial for a local woman. The piece consists of fiber-optic lights embedded in the lawn of Mellon Park, reflecting the night sky on the night of the young woman's birth. The lights are surrounded by granite disks, which are inscribed with the name of each star and facts about them.

== Awards ==
Zweig has received several fellowships and awards including the Rome Prize Fellowship in 1992, and residencies at PS1 Museum and the MacDowell Colony. She has received the Public Art Network Year in Review award for eleven of her public commissions, a New York Foundation for the Arts Fellowship in Computer Arts in 1999, and a National Endowment for the Arts Fellowship for Sculpture in 1994.
