= Vladimir Vakhmistrov =

Russian aerospace engineer

Vladimir Sergeyevich Vakhmistrov (Russian: Владимир Сергеевич Вахмистров) (1897–1972) was a Soviet aviation engineer who is known for creating a series of parasite aircraft projects under the common name Zveno.

== Life and career ==
Vakhmistrov was born on June 27, 1897, in Moscow; his father was an office clerk. He graduated from the Moscow Realschule (реальное училище) in 1915. At the outbreak of the First World War, Vakhmistrov volunteered for the army and was sent to Mikhailovsky Artillery School. He was sent to the front lines in 1916 with the rank of ensign of artillery, but was soon transferred to the Imperial Russian Air Service as a pilot-observer. During the Russian Civil War, Vakhmistrov joined the Red Air Force and fought on the Volga and in Turkestan.

He resumed his studies in 1921, first at Turkestan University and then at the Zhukovsky Air Force Engineering Academy. Vakhmistrov built gliders at the academy: the training AVF-8 "Condor" (1924), the AVF-22 Serpent Horynych (1925, with M. K. Tikhonravov), and Gamayun and Skif (1928, with Tikhonravov and A. A. Dubrovin). In the glider Skif during the sixth All-Union gliding competition (October 6–23, 1929, in Koktebel), pilot A. B. Yumashev set an all-Union flight altitude record for gliders of 1,520 metres (4,990 ft).

From February to April 1926, Vakhmistrov and pilot M. M. Gromov tested the reconnaissance aircraft R-3 (ANT-3): the first Soviet all-metal aircraft, and the first aircraft designed by A. N. Tupolev. Aircraft of this type were subsequently used against the Basmachi movement.

He graduated from the Air Force Academy in 1930, and worked at the Air Force Research Institute. Between 1931 and 1940, Vakhmistrov developed the Vakhmistrov family of composite aircraft: a TB-3 4AM-34FRN heavy bomber with I-16 fighters on a bomb suspension. This concept was the combination of several aircraft, linked rigidly (not in tow) and flying together to:

- Deliver fighter planes beyond their flight range
- Increase the range of a heavy escort aircraft
- Use larger bombs than the fighter planes are capable of carrying
- Facilitate the take-off of an overloaded aircraft with an auxiliary aircraft.

The draft of the first version of the aircraft link, later named Zveno-1 and consisting of a TB-1 bomber and two I-4 fighters, was submitted by Red Army UVVS head I. I. Alksnis in June 1931 and approved by Vakhmistrov. On December 3 of that year, Vakhmistrov (as a second pilot of the bomber) participated in the first flight tests of Link-1: a TB-1 and two I-4s. This was followed by other composite aircraft between 1932 and 1939, including five fighters. Two fighters remained optimal; in the Link TB-3 SPB composite dive bomber, two I-16s carried two FAB-250 bombs.

Vakhmistrov's links were not accepted for service; in accordance with instructions from the Black Sea Fleet Air Force, however, three composite aircraft were equipped with the TB-3 SPB scheme for the bombing of Constanța and Ploiești in July 1941. A triple SPB bombed the Constanța region without losses on July 26, followed by attacks on the Cernavodsky bridge on August 10 and 13. After the successful implementation of the TB-3 SPB project, Vakhmistrov proposed several advanced Link projects: the GTS flying boat, the TB-7 heavy bomber and the MTB-2 (ANT-44) heavy flying boat; hanging fighter planes would have been the I-15bis, I-16, I-180, LaGG-3, and MiG-3.

At the end of 1937, Vakhmistrov's elder brother was arrested; in March 1938, Vakhmistrov was demoted from chief designer to head of the KB-29 design team. He died in 1972, and is buried in Moscow's Vagankovo Cemetery.

== Bibliography ==
- Lesnitchenko, Vladimir (November–December 1999). "Combat Composites: Soviet Use of 'Mother-ships' to Carry Fighters, 1939–1941". Air Enthusiast (84): 4–21. ISSN 0143-5450.
