= Airborne aircraft carrier =

Type of mother ship aircraft

An airborne aircraft carrier is a type of mother ship aircraft which can carry, launch, retrieve and support other smaller parasite aircraft. The only dedicated examples to have been built were airships, although existing heavier-than-air aircraft have been modified for use in similar roles.

== Airship projects ==
In July 1917, experiments were made with aircraft slung under HM Airship No. 23, in hopes that they could defend the airship. First an unmanned, then a manned, Sopwith Camel fighters were launched successfully. The experiment was successfully completed with two other manned Camels.

The British Imperial Airship Scheme of 1924 initially envisaged an airship that could carry five fighter aircraft in military use, but this requirement was abandoned and the project saw only the civilian R100 and R101 airships to completion.

=== Akron-class ===
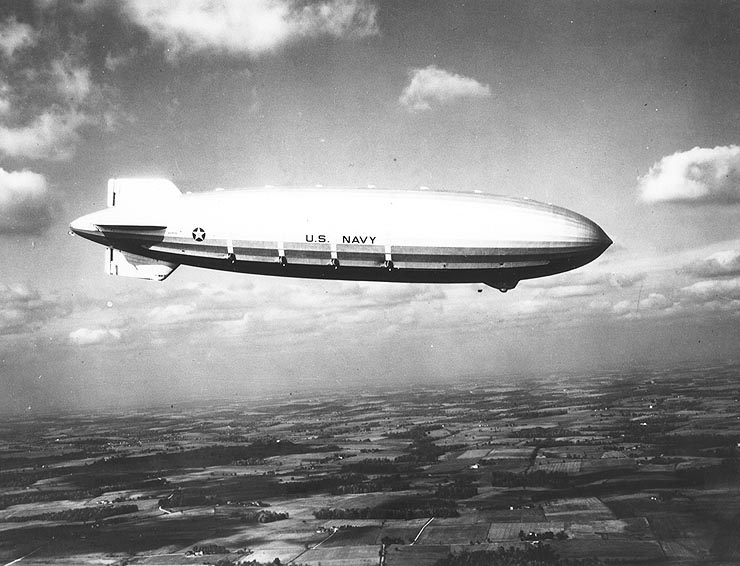
The Akron in flight, November 1931

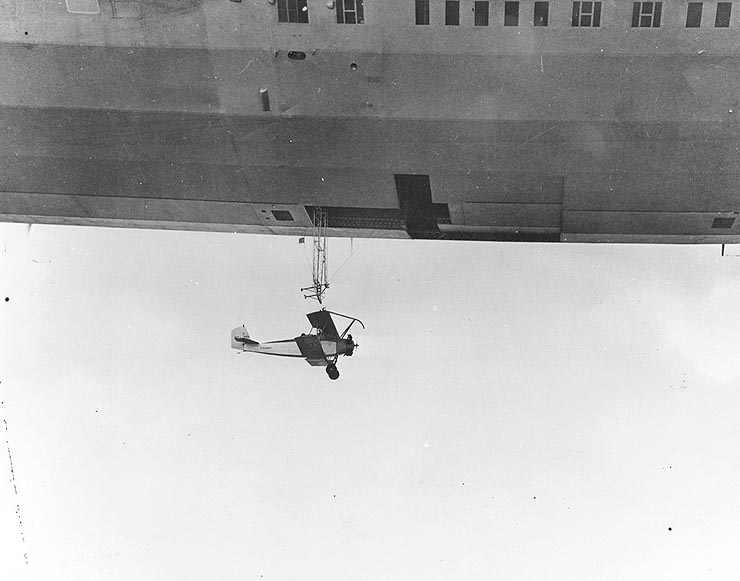
A Consolidated N2Y launches from its trapeze beneath Akron.

The two rigid airships of the Akron class, Akron and Macon, were built for scouting duties for the U.S. Navy and operational between 1931 and 1935.

Following experiments with launching and recovering small aeroplanes using USS Los Angeles, the U.S. Navy designed Akron and Macon with internal hangars able to house a number of Curtiss F9C Sparrowhawk biplane fighters. The fighters were launched and recovered using a "trapeze" mechanism.

With lengths of 785 ft (239 m), Akron and Macon were among the largest flying objects in the world and still hold the world record for helium-filled airships. They were just 20 ft (6.1 m) shorter than the German hydrogen-filled airship Hindenburg.

Akron first flew on 8 August 1931 and Macon followed on 21 April 1933. The Sparrowhawk fighters became operational in September 1932.

During her accident-prone 18-month term of service, the Akron served as an airborne aircraft carrier for launching and recovering F9C Sparrowhawk fighter planes. Akron was destroyed in a thunderstorm off the coast of New Jersey on the morning of 4 April 1933, killing 73 of her 76 crewmen and passengers. This accident was the largest loss of life for any airship crash.

Macon was designed to carry biplane parasite aircraft, five single-seat Curtiss F9C Sparrowhawks for scouting or two-seat Fleet N2Y-1 for training. In service for less than two years, in 1935 Macon was damaged in a storm and lost off California's Big Sur coast, though most of the crew were saved.

=== ZRCV ===
The ZRCV was a proposed successor to the Akron class which was not built. It would have carried 9 dive bombers.

== Non-airship projects ==
=== Zveno project ===
Developed in the Soviet Union during the 1930s, it consisted of a Tupolev TB-1 or a Tupolev TB-3 heavy bomber mothership and two to five fighters. Depending on the variant, the fighters either launched with the mothership or docked in flight, and they could refuel from the bomber. The definitive Zveno-SPB using a TB-3 and two Polikarpov I-16s, each armed with two 250 kg (550 lb) bombs, was used operationally with good results against targets in Romania during the opening stages of the German–Soviet War. The same squadron later carried out an attack against a bridge on the River Dnieper that had been captured by German forces.

=== Convair B-36 Peacemaker ===
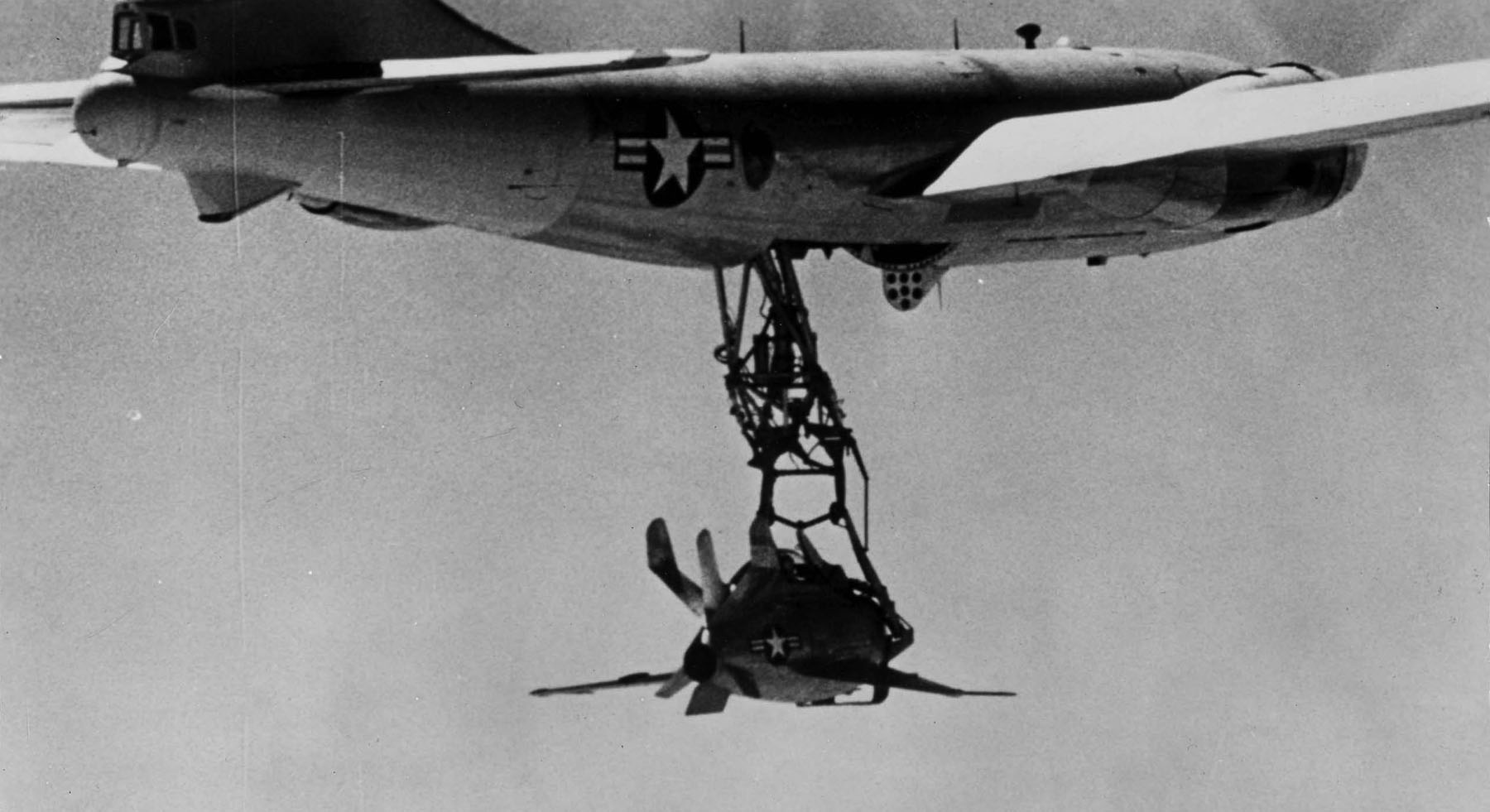
XF-85 and trapeze recovery system mounted on a modified B-29

The B-36 Peacemaker strategic bomber was at one point in the 1950s intended to function as an airborne aircraft carrier for up to four McDonnell F-85 Goblin parasite fighters. Operational F-85-carrying B-36s were to have been capable of refueling and rearming their fighters in flight, while deploying and recovering them on a trapeze-like structure similar to that of the Akron and the Macon. No B-36 was ever equipped to carry the F-85, however, and the two prototypes only flew from a single modified B-29.

=== Fighter-support Vulcan ===
To counter improving Soviet defences after the cancellation of the Skybolt air launched ballistic missile, Avro proposed a Vulcan bomber with three Gnat fighters slung underneath. The Gnats were to have been released in enemy airspace to provide fighter cover, and they were expected to land "in friendly territory" or return to the Vulcan to replenish their tanks by means of a specially installed flight-refuelling drogue.

=== Lockheed CL-1201 ===
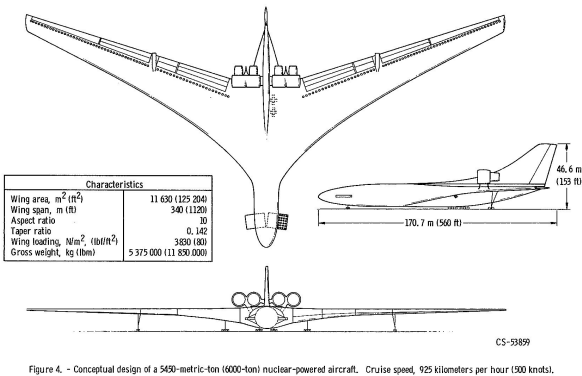
Lockheed CL-1201

The Lockheed CL-1201 was a study in the late 1960s for a giant atomic-powered transport airplane. Having a wing span of 1,120 feet (340 m), one variant studied was an airborne aircraft carrier with a complement of up to 22x F-4 Phantom fighter aircraft carried under its wings.

=== Boeing 747 Airborne Aircraft Carrier ===
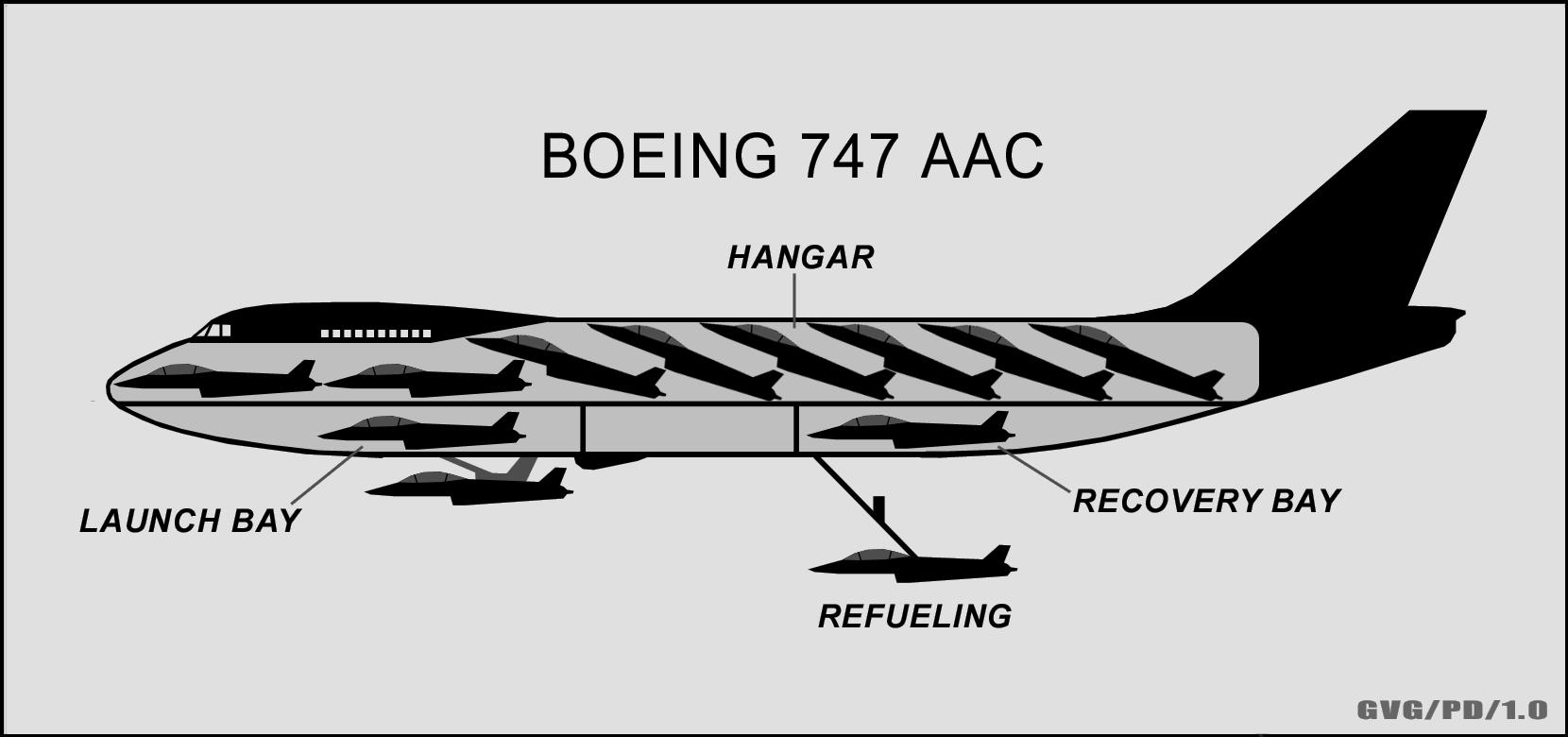
747 "airborne aircraft carrier" concept

Boeing 747-AAC (Airborne Aircraft Carrier) was a proposed Boeing aircraft designed to be an airborne aircraft carrier. It was a variant of the Boeing 747 and a concept which never made it to reality.

In the early 1970s, Boeing conducted a study under a contract from the USAF for an airborne aircraft carrier for up to 10 Boeing Model 985-121 "microfighters", with the ability to launch, retrieve, re-arm, and refuel the microfighters. Boeing believed that the scheme would be able to deliver a flexible and fast carrier platform with global reach, particularly where other bases were not available.

Modified versions of the 747-200 and Lockheed C-5A were considered as the base aircraft. The concept, which included a complementary 747 AWACS version with two reconnaissance "microfighters", was considered technically feasible in 1973.

The design of the 747-AAC had space for a crew of 44. The aircraft was designed to carry 10 Boeing Model 985-121 "microfighters" with the ability to launch, retrieve, re-arm and refuel.

In the blueprints there is a hangar at the top of fuselage where the cabin would be for an airliner, the hangar holds the microfighters. The back end of the aircraft carrier, at the bottom space near the fin has a section for "armaments and spare parts". In the bottom-front there is launch-bay for releasing fighter aircraft and a recovery-bay near the armaments and spare parts section. In the bottom center of the aircraft's fuselage would be a section for fueling its reconnaissance Boeing Model 985-121s.

There would be a sliding deck and pressures hatches which would pressurize and depressurize during the microfighters' launch and retrieval.

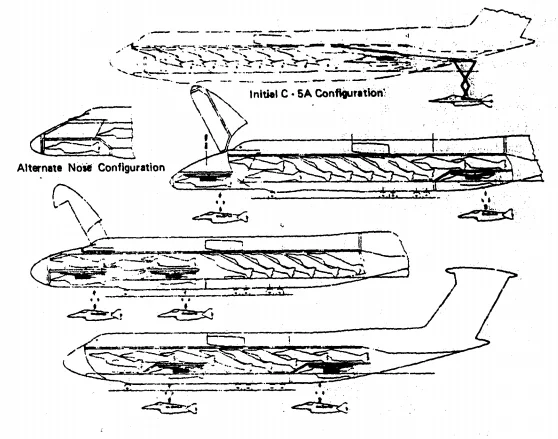
C5-AAC and its configurations

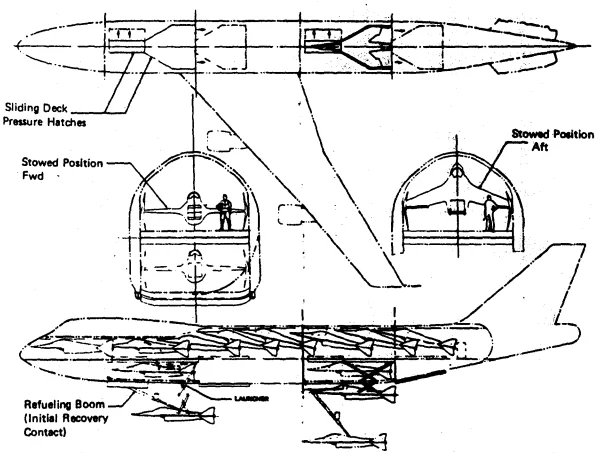
Sliding deck and pressurized hatches

=== Lockheed C-130 Hercules ===
Since 2015, the United States Department of Defense has been investigating the prospect of deploying Dynetics X-61 Gremlins unmanned aerial vehicles from modified Lockheed C-130 Hercules cargo aircraft. The plane will be able to deploy, support and recover drones. After completing their mission, the X-61A will use a proprietary air-recovery method involving a drogue-like receptacle and docking technique. After docking is completed the X-61A will be "reeled in" to the cargo compartment of the C-130. Testing is currently being conducted at Dugway Proving Grounds with International Air Response providing the contracted C-130A.

== In popular culture ==
Airborne aircraft carriers of various types appear in fiction, such as Cloudbase in Captain Scarlet and the Mysterons, the P-1112 Aigaion from Ace Combat 6, the Arsenal Bird from Ace Combat 7, the Helicarrier from Marvel Comics, the Iron Vulture, a hybrid airship from Talespin, the Valiant from series 3 of Doctor Who, and an unnamed one in Sky Captain and the World of Tomorrow.

== See also ==
- Index of aviation articles
- Aircraft cruiser/Battlecarrier
- Composite aircraft
- Drone carrier
- Helicopter carrier
- Parasite aircraft
- Submarine aircraft carrier
- Shuttle Carrier Aircraft
- Conroy Virtus
- Lockheed M-21 drone carrier (SR-71 variant)
- Mid-air retrieval
- List of fictional airborne aircraft carriers

== Works cited ==
- McFadden, Christopher (17 September 2020). "Boeing Once Considered A 747 Fighter Jet Carrier". interestingengineering.com.
- Nisa, Jannat Un (25 September 2020). "Check Out This Novel Concept Of A Flying Aircraft Carrier By The US Airforce". Wonderful Engineering.
- "Boeing 747 AAC". www.boeing-747.com.
