= Zveno project =

Parasite aircraft project

Zveno (Russian: Звено, lit. 'Flight') was a composite aircraft developed in the Soviet Union during the 1930s. It was the brainchild of the aviation engineer Vladimir Vakhmistrov. It consisted of a Tupolev TB-1 or a Tupolev TB-3 heavy bomber mothership and two to five parasite fighters. Depending on the variant, the fighters either launched with the mothership or docked in flight, and they could refuel from the bomber. The definitive Zveno-SPB using a TB-3 and two Polikarpov I-16s, each armed with two 250 kg (550 lb) bombs, was used operationally as a strategic weapon system with good results against targets in the Kingdom of Romania during the opening stages of the Eastern Front campaign in World War II. The same squadron later carried out an attack against a bridge on the Dnieper River that had been captured by German forces.

== Development ==
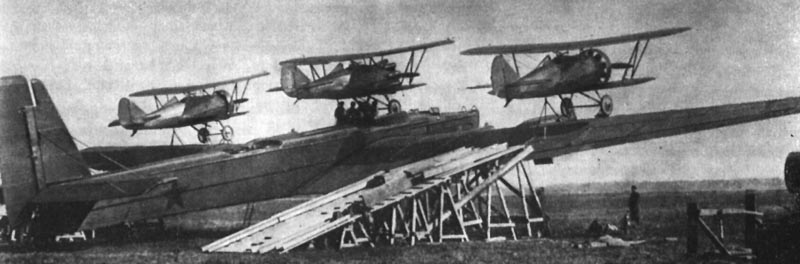
Zveno-2: Tupolev TB-3 and three Polikarpov I-5; also visible is the ramp for loading the fighters; the centerline aircraft was hoisted on top of the fuselage by hand

In June 1931, Vladimir Vakhmistrov from the Scientific Test Institute of the Air Force (Nauchno-Issledovatel'skiy Institut Voyenno-Vozdushnykh Sil, abbr. NII VVS) started work on combinations of fighters rigidly attached to heavy bomber aircraft. The system was envisioned to serve several purposes:

1. Delivery of fighters beyond their conventional range
2. Provision of bombers with escort fighters
3. Use of fighters for dive bombing with heavier bombs than they would be able to take off with on their own
4. Using the added thrust of parasite aircraft to get a heavily loaded bomber airborne

In all Zveno configurations, all aircraft were piloted and all had their engines running—it was expected that the combined thrust would more than offset the weight and actually improve the performance of the mothership compared to conventional bombers. The fighters were rigidly attached via pyramid-shaped metal frames, with both latches controlled by the fighter pilots. On Zveno-1, the front latches were controlled by the bomber crew, while the back latch was controlled by the fighter pilot; this was changed to all-fighter-pilot control in the next version. The original design included umbilical fuel lines which allowed the fighters to use fuel from the bomber while attached, although this was not fully implemented in practice.

The first successful flight of Zveno-1, using a Tupolev TB-1 mothership and two Tupolev I-4 fighters mounted on top of the wings, took place on 3 December 1931. An error in the sequence of opening the latches by the bomber crew resulted in one of the fighters prematurely separating, but the TB-1 – with an I-4 still attached to one of the wings – remained in controlled flight and the second fighter was soon uneventfully deployed. After latch control was fully moved onto the fighters, the normal launch procedure consisted of fighter pilots opening the tail lock and then pulling on the control stick to open the front locks and separate from the bomber. As predicted, the presence of docked fighters had a minimal impact on performance of the mothership, and Zveno-2 Tupolev TB-3 carrying three Polikarpov I-5 fighters handled the same as an ordinary bomber. To mount the aircraft on the wings, they were pushed up special ramps but the centerline aircraft had to be lifted on top of the fuselage by hand. This was so cumbersome that the centerline I-5 became a permanent fixture on top of the Zveno-2 TB-3 and never started in the air. At one point, the centerline I-5, still with a pilot at the controls to operate the engine, had the wings and the tail surfaces removed and was used purely as a fifth powerplant for the bomber mothership.

The Zveno-3 in which a TB-3 carried two Grigorovich I-Z fighters under the wings presented a different challenge—the I-Z was a monoplane with fixed landing gear which touched the ground while it was suspended under the mothership. To accommodate uneven ground during takeoffs, the fighters were attached via a floating frame that permitted vertical movement relative to the TB-3. However, immediately after takeoff the I-Z pilots had to push forward on the control sticks to lock the frame in the fixed bottom position—if the fighter-bomber was not held rigid in flight, the bomber became extremely difficult to control. During one of the test flights, one I-Z pilot, Korotkov, incorrectly timed the locking maneuver and the lift generated by his fighter broke the docking frame and he crashed him into the underside of the mothership's wing. The bomber then attempted an emergency landing with both fighters still attached. At the relatively slow landing speed of the TB-3 there was a loss of lift for the I-Z which fell away, killing Korotkov. This was the most serious accident of the entire Zveno program despite the inherent complexity of carrying as many as five aircraft, performing mid-air launches and dockings, and damage to the motherships by propellers and landing gear of the fighters. Tests with various combinations of aircraft determined that top-mounted configurations presented the most difficulty in docking due to turbulent airflow coming off the mothership's wings. The problem of safe underwing attachment was solved with the introduction of the Polikarpov I-16 fighter with retractable landing gear, permitting the use of the same rigid mounting frames as for the top-mounted aircraft.

The mothership and its fighters were unofficially nicknamed the "Vakhmistrov's Circus" (Russian: Цирк Вахмистрова).

The military ordered 40 carriers to be split between the navy and army, but the Soviets were worried of an invasion by the Germans, and production was shifted toward proven weapons. Only five carriers were ever delivered.

== Configurations ==
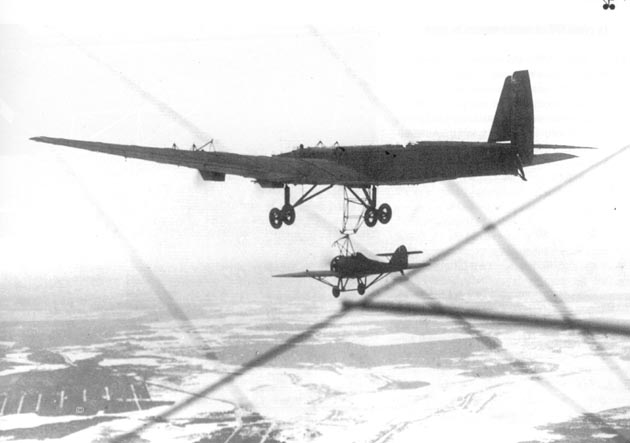
TB-3 docking with a Grigorovich I-Z under the fuselage

Zveno-1
Tupolev TB-1 and two Tupolev I-4 on top of the wings. The normally sesquiplane I-4s had the bottom wings removed (with no ill effect on flight characteristics) due to clearance problems with TB-1 propellers. First flight 3 December 1931. The TB-1 was piloted by A. I. Zalevskiy and A. R. Sharapov, the I-4s were piloted by Valery Chkalov and A. F. Anisimov. Vakhmistrov himself flew in the front gunner's turret.

Zveno-1a
TB-1 and two Polikarpov I-5 on the wings, first flight September 1933. The TB-1 was piloted by Stefanovskiy, the I-5s were piloted by Kokkinaki and Grozd.

Zveno-2
Tupolev TB-3 and three I-5, the third aircraft was attached over the fuselage. First flight August 1934. The TB-3 was piloted by Zalevskiy, the I-5s were piloted by Altynov, Suprun, and Suzi.

Zveno-3
TB-3 and two Grigorovich I-Z under the wings.

Zveno-5
TB-3 and a single I-Z under the fuselage which attached and detached in the air as there was not enough ground clearance for the fighter. On 23 March 1935, TB-3 piloted by Stefanovskiy and I-Z with Stepanchenok at the controls performed the world's first mid-air docking between two fixed wing aircraft.

Zveno-6
TB-3 and two Polikarpov I-16 which were attached on the ground with the landing gear retracted. First flight August 1935, with the TB-3 piloted by Stefanovskiy, and the I-16s piloted by Budakov and Nikashin. I-16s could only detach, not re-attach, in flight

Zveno-7
TB-3 and two I-16s, all docked in the air. First flight November 1939, pilots Stefanovskiy, Nyukhtikov, and Suprun. Fighters could re-attach in flight due to two retractable trapezes, one under each wing. Docking, while possible, was deemed too difficult to be practical.

Aviamatka (lit. 'Airborne mothership')
TB-3 with two I-16s under the wings, two I-5s on top of the wings, and one I-Z attached under the fuselage in mid-air. First flight 20 November 1935. The TB-3 was piloted by Zalevskiy, the fighters piloted by Stefanovskiy, Nikashin, Altynov, Suprun, and Stepanchenok. Vakhmistrov also worked on a larger Aviamatka with eight I-16s. In this scheme, the TB-3 would get airborne with two I-16s under the wings and the remaining six would attach in the air. Not all eight would attach at one time, but would rotate in and out during the flight, detaching and re-attaching as needed. These six aircraft could also refuel from the mothership. Although a few successful mid-air dockings and fuel transfers were performed in 1938 (Zveno-6 and 7), the eight-fighter configuration was never completed.

SPB (Sostavnoi Pikiruyuschiy Bombardirovschik, lit. 'Combined Dive Bomber')
TB-3-4AM-34FRN and two I-16s under the wings, each armed with a pair of 250 kg (550 lb) FAB-250 bombs. Used operationally in World War II with good success.

== Operational history ==
Zveno-SPB: TB-3-4M-34FRN with two Polikarpov I-16s armed with FAB-250 bombs

In 1938, Vakhmistrov devised the Zveno-SPB (Sostavnoi Pikiruyuschiy Bombardirovschik, lit. 'Combined Dive Bomber') which consisted of a Tupolev TB-3-4AM-34FRN mothership and two Polikarpov I-16 Type 5 fighters. Each of the fighters was armed with a pair of 250 kg (550 lb) FAB-250 high-explosive bombs. Although an I-16 Type 5 could get airborne on its own with no more than 100 kg (220 lb) of bombs, once hoisted in the air by the TB-3 it could reach 410 km/h (220 kn; 250 mph) at 2,500 m (8,200 ft), had a service ceiling of 6,800 m (22,300 ft), and could dive at up to 650 km/h (350 kn; 400 mph). Once the bombs were dropped, the SPB-launched I-16s performed like conventional Type 5s. The three-aircraft Zveno-SPB had a total takeoff weight of 22,000 kg (49,000 lb), a top speed of 268 km/h (145 kn; 167 mph), and a range of 2,500 km (1,300 nmi; 1,600 mi). The use of a mothership increased the range of the I-16s by 80%.

The SPB first flew in July 1937. Following the successful test program in 1938, the Zveno-SPB was accepted into service. By 1 February 1940, the Soviet Air Force was supposed to receive 20 TB-3s and 40 I-16s, with the same number going to the Soviet Naval Aviation. Vakhmistrov was also asked to investigate the possibility of using Tupolev TB-7, Tupolev MTB-2, and the GST (a transport version of the American Consolidated PBY Catalina flying boat) as the motherships, as well as arming I-16s with 500 kg (1,100 lb) bombs. By 1939, government support for the project had waned, the Soviet Navy canceled all of its orders, and the Soviet Air Force reduced the number of fighters from 40 to 12. However, Soviet military observers noted the success of the German Junkers Ju 87 Stuka dive bombers in the opening stages of World War II. As the Soviet Union had no dive bombers, it was decided to resume low-scale work on the Zveno-SPB. Testing of the first production Zveno began in June 1940. It differed from the prototype in using the much more powerful I-16 Type 24 fighters. Six mothership-fighter combinations (six TB-3s and twelve modified I-16 Type 24s) were completed. All were attached to the 2nd Special Squadron of the 32nd Fighter Regiment of the 62nd Aviation Brigade of the Black Sea Fleet Air Force stationed in Yevpatoria, western Crimea. Mirroring the nickname of the Zveno experiments, the squadron was dubbed "Shubikov's Circus" (Russian: Цирк Шубикова) after its commander Arseniy Shubikov.

Zveno-SPB saw limited but successful combat use on the Eastern Front of World War II. In the opening stages, the Black Sea Fleet Air Force was tasked with destroying industrial targets in the Nazi Germany-allied Kingdom of Romania. The most important of these was the King Carol I Bridge over the Danube which carried the Ploieşti-Constanța oil pipeline. After several failed attempts to destroy the heavily protected bridge with conventional bombers, the task was given to the Zveno squadron. As a combat test, it was decided to first attack the Constanţa oil depot. On 26 July 1941, two Zveno-SPB aircraft performed a successful attack on the depot in broad daylight with no losses. The fighters disconnected 40 km (22 nmi; 25 mi) from the target and returned to the home airfield under their own power.

The first of the two bridge raids took place on 10 August 1941. For this mission, the I-16s were fitted with additional 95-liter (21 imp gal; 25 U.S. gal) underwing fuel tanks for an additional 35 minutes of flight time. Of the three Zveno-SPBs, one had to turn back due to mechanical problems. The other two launched their fighters 15 km (8.1 nmi; 9.3 mi) from the Romanian coastline. The fighters successfully dive-bombed from the altitude of 1,800 m (5,900 ft) and returned home with no losses despite heavy anti-aircraft fire. The second raid took place on 13 August 1941. This time, all three Zveno-SPBs reached the target. The six fighters scored five direct hits on the bridge and completely destroyed one of the spans. On the way back, the fighters strafed Romanian infantry near Sulina and returned to Eupatoria with no losses. Following the successful sorties, two additional Zveno-SPB were brought to operational status, bringing the total to five. The main limiting factor was the lack of high-output Mikulin AM-34FRN engines, as the other versions were not powerful enough to get the aircraft airborne. On 16 August 1941, Admiral Nikolai Kuznetsov asked Joseph Stalin for additional AM-34FRN-engined TB-3s from the Air Force so they could be converted to Zveno-SPB carriers, but the request was denied as the Air Force had suffered heavy losses in the opening days of the war. In the meantime, the five aircraft continued flying operational sorties, destroying a dry dock in Constanţa on 17 August and a bridge across the Dnieper River on 28 August, losing one I-16 in the process. During the repeat attack the next day, four Zveno-launched I-16s engaged several Messerschmitt Bf 109s, shooting down two. Despite the high success rate, Zveno missions ended by 1942 due to high vulnerability of the obsolete TB-3s and I-16s in the face of enemy air superiority. It is estimated that Zveno-SPB flew at least 30 combat missions.

== See also ==
- Airborne aircraft carrier
- Short Mayo Composite – long-range air transport combination of two seaplanes operated by Imperial Airways in the late 1930s
- Mistel – various fighter-bomber combinations used by Luftwaffe during World War II for attacking large heavily defended targets
- FICON project – Convair B-36–F-84F Thunderstreak combination for fighter escort and long-range reconnaissance used by the United States Air Force during the Cold War

== Bibliography ==
- Lesnitchenko, Vladimir (November–December 1999). "Combat Composites: Soviet Use of 'Mother-ships' to Carry Fighters, 1939–1941". Air Enthusiast (84): 4–21. ISSN 0143-5450.
