= Composite aircraft =

Airborne carrier and parasite planes

A composite aircraft is made up of multiple component craft. It takes off and flies initially as a single aircraft, with the components able to separate in flight and continue as an independent aircraft. Typically the larger aircraft acts as a carrier aircraft or mother ship, with the smaller sometimes called a parasite or jockey craft.

The first composite aircraft flew in 1916, during World War I, when the British launched a Bristol Scout from a Felixstowe Porte Baby flying boat. Between the World Wars, American experiments with airship/biplane composites led to the construction of two airborne aircraft carriers, while the British Short Mayo seaplane composite demonstrated successful transatlantic mail delivery. During the Second World War some composites saw operational use including the Mistel ("mistletoe"), the larger unmanned component of a composite aircraft configuration developed in Germany during the later stages of World War II, in effect a two-part manned flying bomb. Experiments continued into the jet age, with large aircraft carrying fully capable parasite fighters or reconnaissance drones, though none entered service.

== Design principles ==
A composite configuration is usually adopted to provide improved performance or operational flexibility for one of the components, compared to a single craft flying alone. Composite designs can take a number of different forms:

In the original composite arrangement, the smaller component carries out the operational mission and is mounted on a larger carrier aircraft or "mother ship". Thus it need not be compromised by the requirements for takeoff, climb and initial cruise, but may be optimised for the later stages of the mission.

In another form the larger carrier aircraft conducts the main operational mission, with small parasite aircraft carried to support it or extend its mission if required.

A third variant comprises a small piloted jockey component coupled with a larger unpiloted component. This arrangement is typically used as an attack aircraft in which the larger component is loaded with explosives and impacts the target.

The slip-wing composite comprises a lightweight upper lifting component, the slip wing, which assists the lower operational component during initial takeoff and climb: in the true slip-wing, the two wings act together as a biplane. The slip wing component may or may not be powered and/or manned.

== Airship-aeroplane composites ==
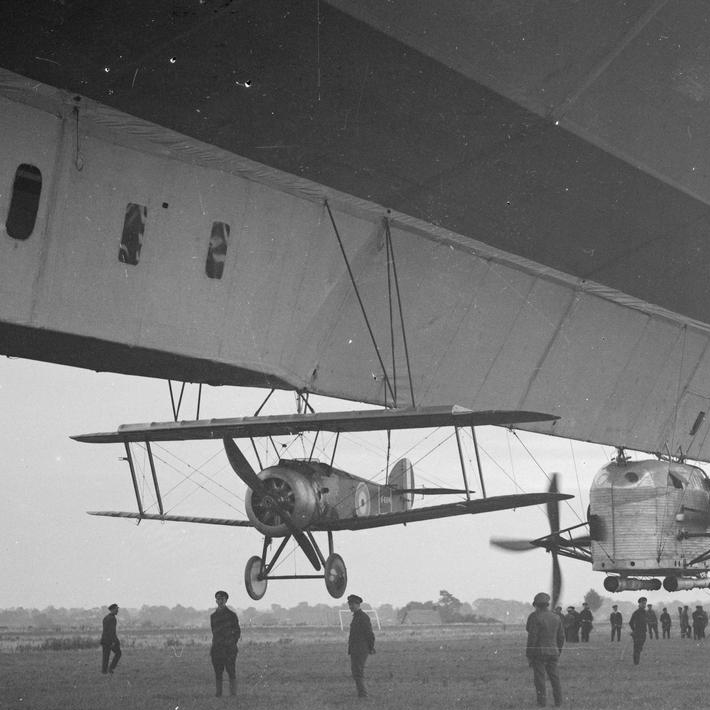
Sopwith 2F.1 Camel suspended under airship R23

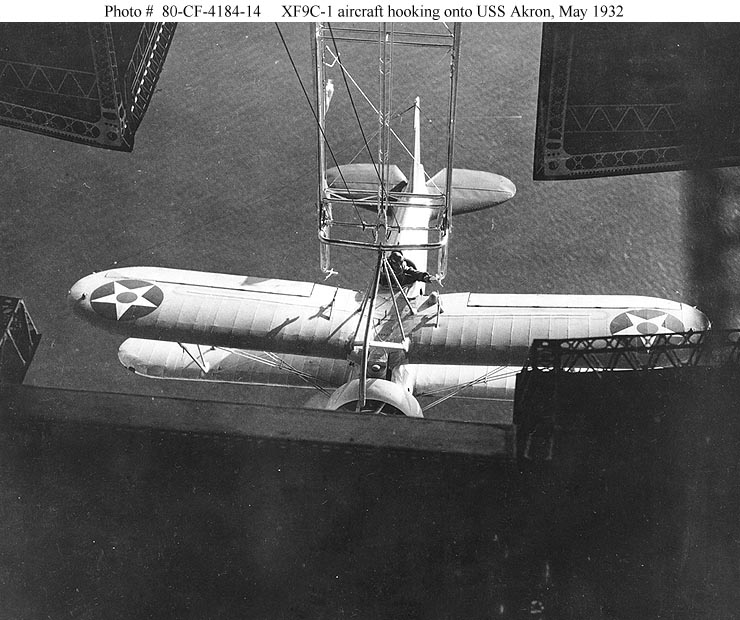
F9C Sparrowhawk on the Akron's trapeze

During and after World War I, a number of efforts were made to develop airship-plane composites, in which one or more aeroplanes were carried by an airship.

=== United Kingdom ===
The first British effort, undertaken in 1916 with a non-rigid SS class airship, was aimed at the anti-Zeppelin role. The airship was to provide fast climb to altitude, while a B.E.2c aeroplane would provide the speed and manoeuvrability to attack the Zeppelin. It ended in disaster when the forward attachment point released prematurely and the aeroplane tipped nose-down. Both crew were killed in the ensuing disaster. By 1918 larger rigid airships were available and a Sopwith Camel was successfully released by HMA 23 in July 1918, but the armistice halted work. The idea was briefly revived in 1925 when the airship R33 was used to launch and then recapture a DH 53 Hummingbird light monoplane aircraft and, in 1926, two Gloster Grebe biplane fighters.

=== Germany ===
The first parasite fighter was a German Albatros D.III which flew from Zeppelin L 35 (LZ 80) on January 26, 1918. The LZ 129 Hindenburg later conducted trials using parasite aircraft in the days before it crashed at Lakehurst, but the trial proved unsuccessful as the plane hit the hull trapeze.

=== United States ===
In 1923 the TC-3 and TC-7 non-rigid airships launched and recovered a Sperry Messenger biplane.

Then in 1930, the US Navy fitted the USS Los Angeles with a trapeze designed to release and recover a small parasite aircraft. Successful trials with a glider and a biplane led to the construction of the Akron and Macon airships as airborne aircraft carriers.

=== List of airship-aeroplane composites ===
Airship	Aircraft	Country	Date	Status	Description
L 35/LZ 80	Albatros D.III	Germany	February 1918	launched only	Also tested glider bomb
HMA 23	Sopwith 2F.1 Camel	UK	November 1918	launched only	
TC-3	Sperry Messenger	US	December 1924	launched & recovered	USAAC Non-rigid airship
TC-7	Sperry Messenger	US	December 1924	launched & recovered	USAAC Non-rigid airship
R33	de Havilland DH.53	UK	October 1926	launched & recovered	
R33	Gloster Grebe	UK	December 1926	launched & recovered	Two fighters carried simultaneously
USS Los Angeles (ZR-3)	Vought UO-1	US	July 1929	launched & recovered	US Navy airship
USS Los Angeles (ZR-3)	RRG Prüfling glider	US	January 1931	launched only	
USS Los Angeles (ZR-3)	Consolidated N2Y-1	US	September 1931	hookup	1st night hookup
LZ 129 Hindenburg	Focke-Wulf Fw 44	Germany	March 1937	unsuccessful	US trapeze design, intended for mail planes.

== Composite aeroplanes ==
=== The first composite aeroplanes ===
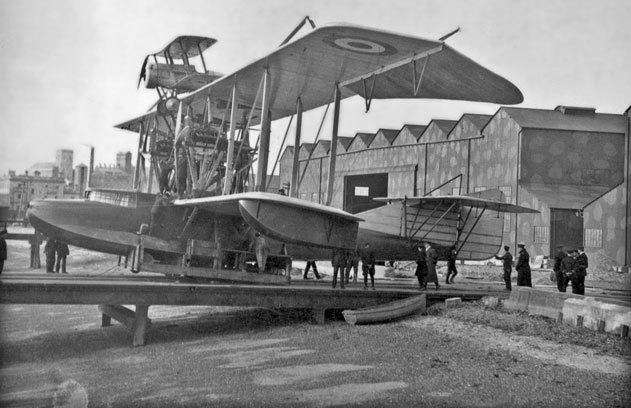
Bristol Scout on Porte Baby

In parallel with early airship activity, efforts also went into carrying a fighter plane aloft on top of a second aeroplane.

In the UK, the Felixstowe Porte Baby/Bristol Scout composite flew in May 1916. The idea was to intercept German Zeppelin airships far out to sea, beyond the normal range of a land or shore based craft. The successful first flight was not followed up, due to the ungainliness of the composite in takeoff and its vulnerability in flight. From 1921, a series of types were adapted as carriers for gliders used as aerial targets.

The Short Mayo Composite mailplane comprised the S.21 Maia carrier flying boat and S.20 Mercury parasite seaplane. It made successful transatlantic flights in trials during 1938, before operations were cut short by the outbreak of war.

=== World War II ===
Several countries experimented with composite designs during the second world war, and a few of these were used on operational missions.

In the USSR, the Tupolev Vakhmistrov Zveno project developed a series of composite types. The SPB variant used the Tupolev TB-3 as the mother ship and in 1941 Polikarpov I-16 dive-bombers flying from it became the first parasite fighters to see successfully operate in combat.

In the UK, Pemberton-Billing proposed "slip-wing" composite bomber and fighter types, early in the war. Hawker's also worked on a Liberator/Hurricane composite.

In America in 1943, O.A. Buettner patented a composite design in which the secondary fighter components' wings fitted into depressions in the carrier's upper wing.

A number of composite proposals were considered by German designers during World War II. Of these, the Junkers Ju 88 Mistel project reached operational status, mounting either a manned Messerschmitt Bf 109 or Focke-Wulf Fw 190 fighter above an unmanned shaped charge-warheaded Junkers Ju 88 and flying a number of combat missions. The führungsmaschine (pathfinder) project used a similar Ju 88/Fw 190 combination where the Ju 88 was also manned and the Fw 190 was carried as a protective escort fighter. The Dornier Do 217/Messerschmitt Me 328 escort fighter project was unsuccessful due to engine problems. Other studies included the Daimler-Benz Project C.

=== Post-war ===
Experiments with parasite aircraft continued into the jet age in America, as well as in France for their own advanced jet and rocket-powered experimental designs. This was first achieved with the pair of four-engined high altitude Heinkel He 274 bomber prototypes, both built in France.

In America, the FIghter CONveyer (FICON) trapeze system was developed for carrying, launching and recovering parasite fighters. Examples with and without the FICON system included:

- B-36/XF-85 Goblin, an attempt to equip bombers with their own escort fighters (1948)
- Convair B-36/F-84, a more successful, escort fighter attempt (1952)
- Lockheed DC-130/Q-2C Firebee, drone launched and controlled from C-130 "mother"
- Lockheed D-21/M-21, for high-speed reconnaissance, based upon the SR-71 Blackbird (1963)
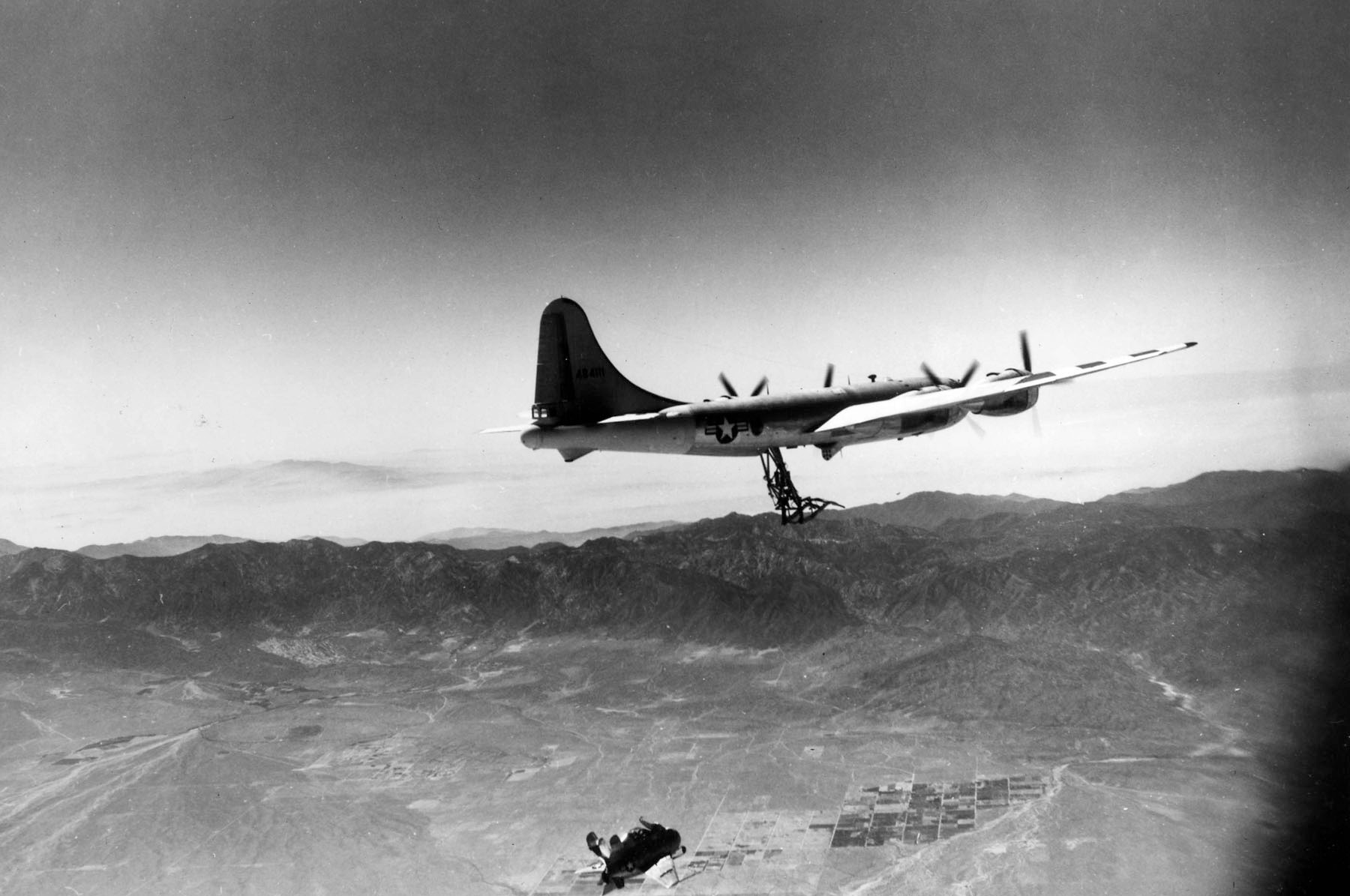
Boeing EB-29 with FICON trapeze and McDonnell XF-85 Goblin parasite fighter

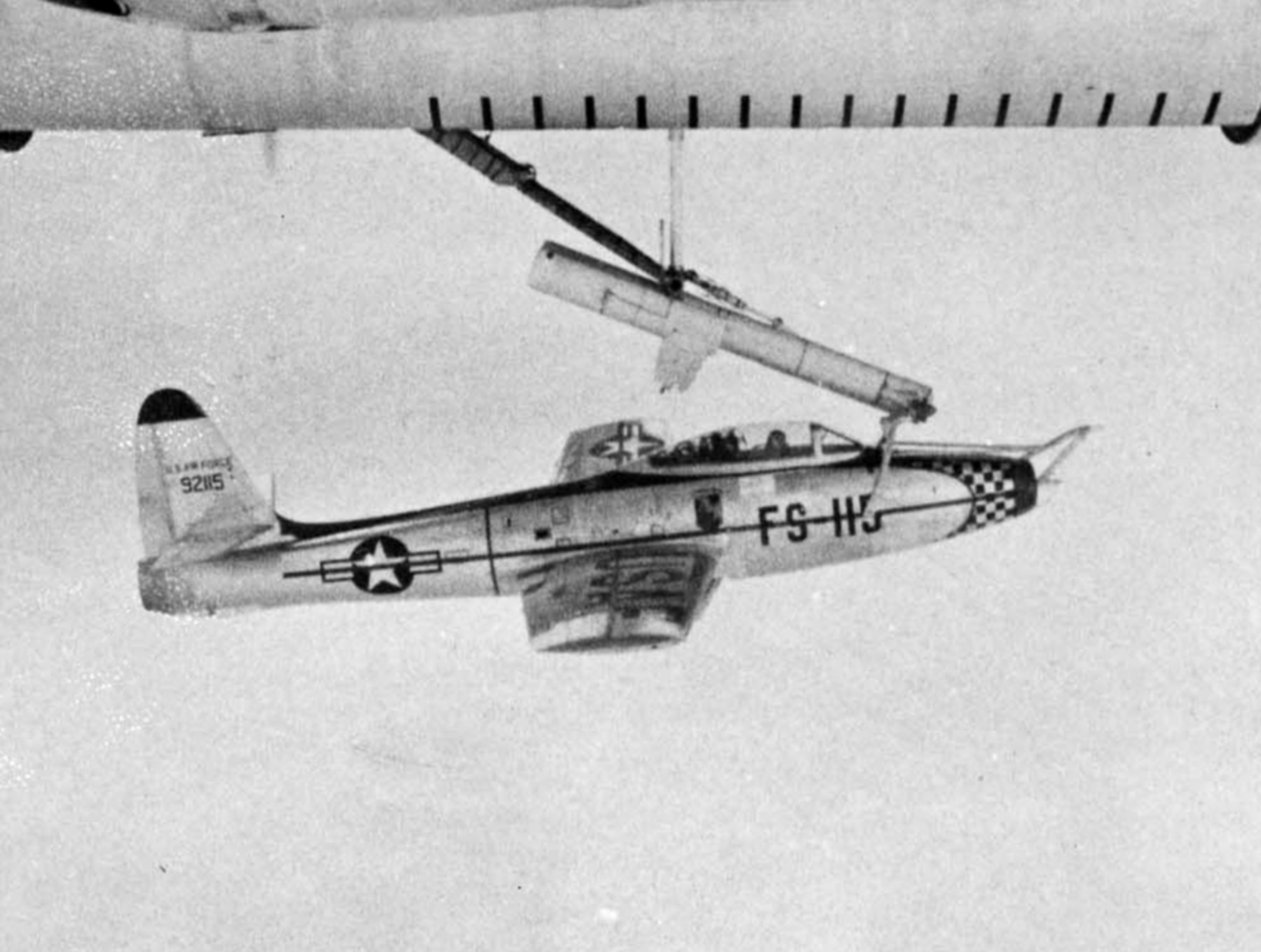
A Republic F-84E on FICON trapeze

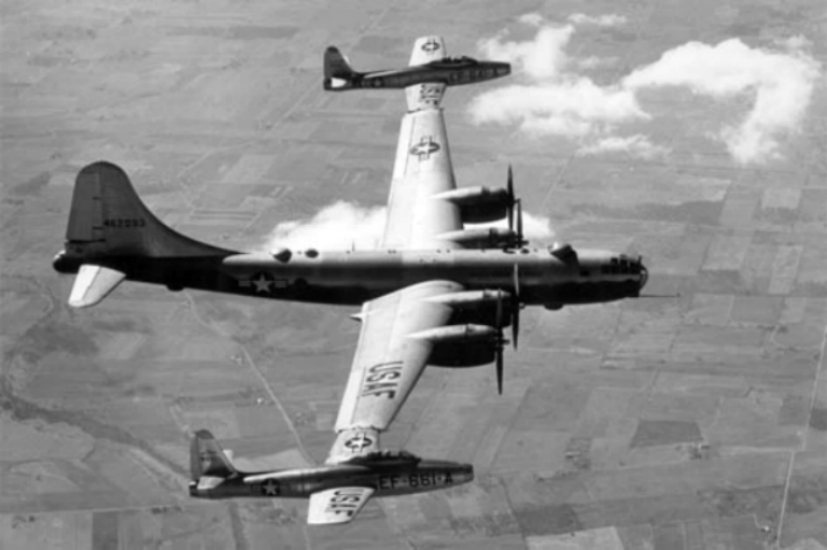
Project Tom Tom: Boeing B-29 with Republic F-84 Thunderjets

Elsewhere, during the 1950s in the UK, Short Brothers studied proposals for a composite VTOL strike fighter but the design did not progress.

In modern times the term "composite aircraft" tends to refer to types constructed from composite materials. The White Knight/Space Ship One spaceplane is a composite aircraft in both senses.

=== List of composite aeroplanes ===
Type	Country	Date	Parasite Role	Status	Description
Boeing B-29/Republic F-84 Thunderjet	US	1950	Fighter	Prototype	Project Tom-Tom & Tip-Tow
Convair B-36/McDonnell XF-85 Goblin	US	1948	Fighter	Prototype	FICON project
Convair B-36/Republic F-84 Thunderjet	US	1952	Fighter	Prototype	FICON project
Dornier Do 217/Messerschmitt Me 328	Germany	n/a	Fighter	Prototype	
Felixstowe Porte Baby/Bristol Scout	UK	1916	Fighter	Prototype	First composite aircraft.
Mistel programme	Germany	1941	Jockey	Operational	Missile system. Several variants.
Scaled Composites White Knight/SpaceShipOne	US	2003	Spacecraft	Prototype	
Short Mayo Composite	UK	1938	Commercial	Operational	"Maia" mother craft and "Mercury" parasite
Zveno-SPB	USSR	1941	Multi-role	Operational	TB-3 bomber carried several modified I-16.

== See also ==
- Parasite aircraft
