= Parasite aircraft =

Small plane aboard an airborne carrier

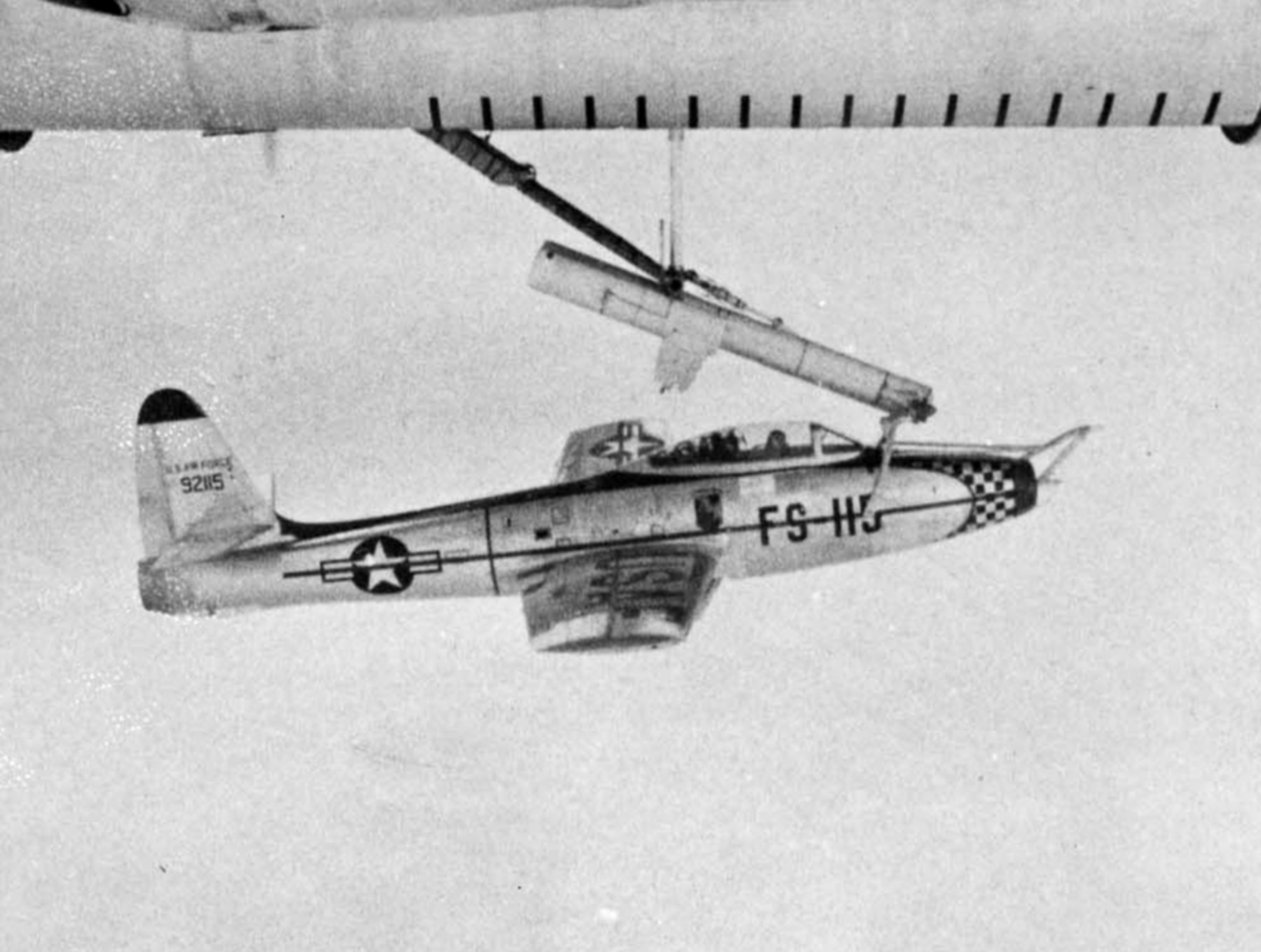
An F-84 Thunderjet hooked on a FICON trapeze beneath its mother ship, circa 1955

A parasite aircraft is a component of a composite aircraft which is carried aloft and air launched by a larger carrier aircraft or mother ship to support the primary mission of the carrier. The carrier craft may or may not be able to later recover the parasite during flight.

The first parasite aircraft flew in 1916, when the British launched a Bristol Scout from a Felixstowe Porte Baby flying boat. The idea eventually developed into jet bombers carrying fully capable parasite fighters. With the advent of long-range fighters equipped with air-to-air missiles, and aerial refueling, parasite fighters fell out of use.

== Parasite fighters ==
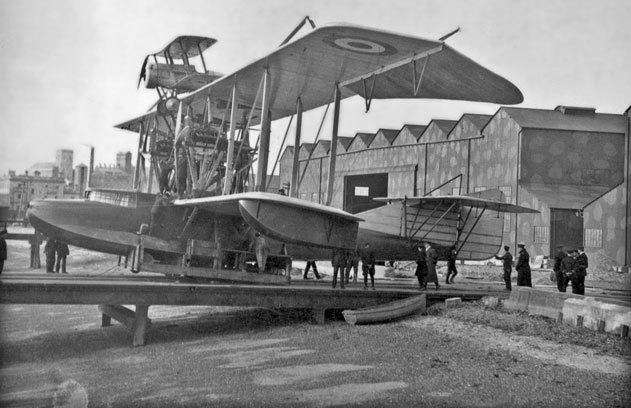
Bristol Scout on Porte Baby, 1916

Until the middle of the 20th century there was military interest in parasite fighters – fighter aircraft intended to be carried into a combat zone by a larger aircraft, such as a bomber. If the bomber were threatened, the parasite would be released to defend it. Parasite fighters have never been highly successful and have seldom been used in combat. A major disadvantage of a parasite aircraft was that it reduced the payload capacity of the carrier aircraft. Projects for this type were designed to overcome the great disparity in range between bombers and their escort fighters. Development of aerial refueling has made parasite fighters obsolete.

=== 1910s ===
The first parasite fighters were launched and recovered from trapezes mounted externally to military airships. In 1915 Neville Usborne and another British officer worked on a plan to lift a BE.2C fighter under an SS-class non-rigid airship. This would allow the fighter to reach the height of a raiding Zeppelin rapidly while also conserving fuel. In the first experimental flight on 21 February 1916, the envelope lost pressure and the plane was prematurely separated from it at 4,000 ft (1,200 m). Both officers were killed and there was no further experimentation with small airships.

In May 1916 a Bristol Scout flown by Flt. Lt. M. J. Day was mounted above the top wing of a Porte Baby flying boat flown by Sqn. Ldr John Cyril Porte, and was successfully released at a height of 1,000 ft (300 m). Although successful, the scheme, intended to provide long-range defence against Zeppelins, was not pursued.

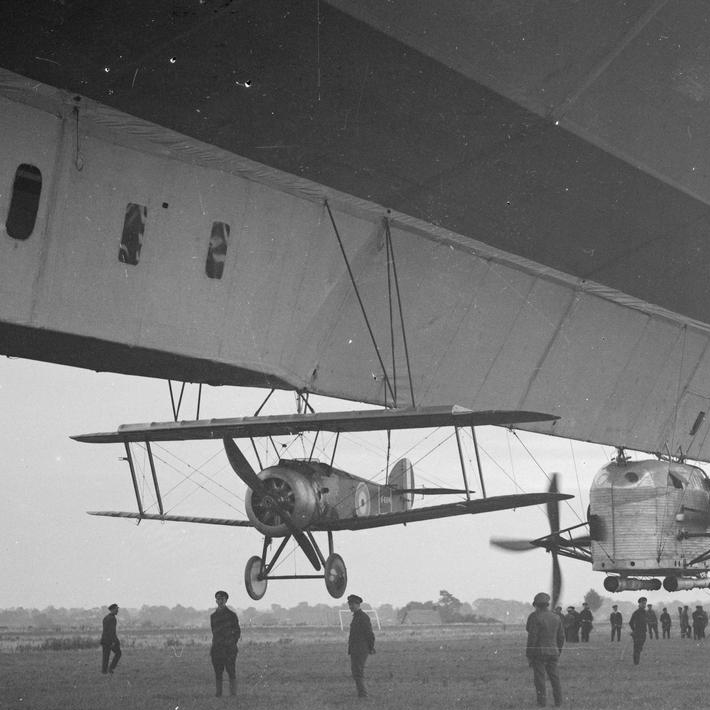
A Sopwith 2F.1 Camel secured under the British HM Airship 23r, 1918

In 1918 the Royal Air Force experimented with launching Sopwith Camel fighters from HM Airship 23.

The Germans also experimented with the idea, suspending an Albatros D.III fighter aeroplane below a Zeppelin and releasing it at altitude: the intention was to use the aeroplane to defend airships against the British seaplane patrols encountered over the North Sea. Although the single trial, made on 25 January 1918, was successful the experiments were not continued.

On 12 December 1918, in a test to determine the feasibility of carrying fighter aircraft on dirigibles, the airship C-1 lifted a US Army Curtiss JN-4 aircraft to 2,500 ft (760 m) over Fort Tilden, New York, and at that height released it for a free flight back to base. The airship was piloted by Lieutenant George Crompton, Dirigible Officer at NAS Rockaway, and the airplane by Lieutenant A. W. Redfield, US, commander of the 52nd Aero Squadron based at Mineola (Long Island, NY).

=== 1920s ===
The British Imperial Airship Scheme of 1924 envisaged a commercial airship that could also carry five fighter aircraft if put into military use, but this requirement was abandoned. In 1925 first the DH.53 light aeroplane and then Gloster Grebes had been launched from the airship R.33.

=== 1930s ===
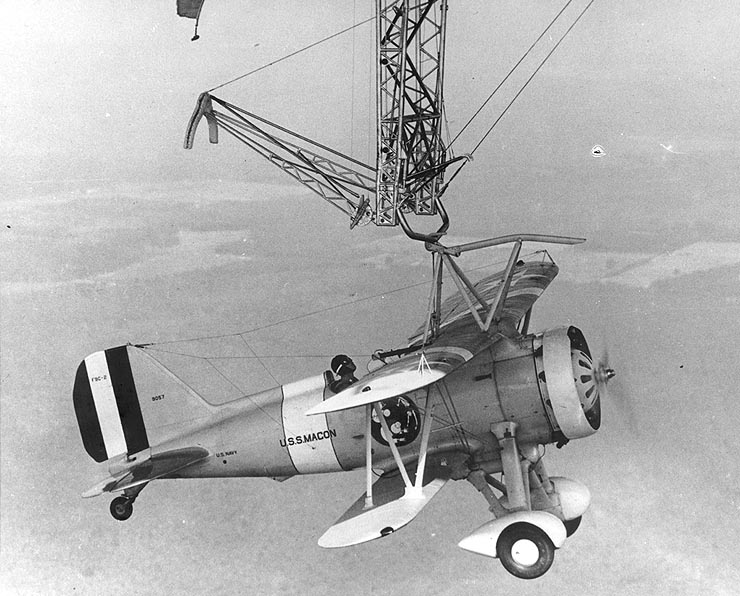
A Curtiss F9C Sparrowhawk attached by a "skyhook" to USS Macon, 1933

In 1930, the US Navy airship USS Los Angeles was used to test the trapeze system developed to launch and recover fixed wing aircraft from rigid airships. The tests were a success, and the newly built Navy airships USS Akron and USS Macon were designed to carry parasite aircraft inside a hangar bay within the hull. Each airship could carry up to five single-seat Curtiss F9C Sparrowhawks for scouting or two-seat Fleet N2Y-1s for training. In 1934, two two-seat Waco UBF XJW-1 biplanes equipped with skyhooks were delivered to the USS Macon.

The temporary system was removed from the Los Angeles, which never carried any aircraft on operational flights. In 1930, the Los Angeles also tested the launching of a glider over Lakehurst, New Jersey.

Although operations of these parasite aircraft were quite successful, the accidental loss of the Akron in 1933 and the Macon in 1935, ended the program.

The first bombers to carry parasite fighters did so as part of the Zveno experiments carried out in the Soviet Union by Vladimir Vakhmistrov from 1931. Up to five fighters of various types were carried by Tupolev TB-1 and Tupolev TB-3 bombers.

=== 1940s ===
In August 1941, these combinations would fly the only combat missions ever undertaken by parasite fighters. TB-3s carrying Polikarpov I-16SPB dive bombers attacked the Cernavodă bridge and Constantsa docks, in Romania. After that, this squadron, based in the Crimea, carried out a tactical attack on a bridge over the river Dnieper at Zaporozhye, which had been captured by advancing German troops.

Later in World War II, the Luftwaffe experimented with the Messerschmitt Me 328 as a parasite fighter, but problems with its pulsejet engines could not be overcome. Other late-war rocket-powered projects such as the Arado E.381 and Sombold So 344 never left the experimental stage. By contrast, the Empire of Japan was able to get the Yokosuka MXY7 Ohka kamikaze rocket plane type into active service, typically using the Mitsubishi G4M (Betty) bomber class to carry them within range. However, their effectiveness proved minimal in part because Allied air naval defense took advantage of the weight of the parasitical aircraft payload slowing the carrying bombers, making them vulnerable to interception before the rocket plane could launch.

=== 1950s ===
During the early years of the Cold War, the United States Air Force experimented with a variety of parasite fighters to protect its Convair B-36 bombers, including the dedicated XF-85 Goblin, and methods of either carrying a Republic F-84 Thunderjet in the bomber's bomb bay (the FICON project), or attached to the bomber's wingtips (Project Tom-Tom). One configuration studied for the XF-85/B-36 combination was for a B-36 to drop the XF-85 for a dash across enemy territory for bombing or reconnaissance and for the pilot to hook onto a different B-36 on the other side of the enemy territory. These projects were all soon abandoned, partly because aerial refueling appeared as a much safer solution to extend the range of fighters.

== Drone motherships ==
As of 2014, DARPA was working on a project to launch and recover unmanned aerial vehicles from larger aircraft.

== Examples ==
Examples that have flown include:

- A Bristol Scout was flown from a Porte Baby to become the first parasite aircraft (1916)
- An Albatros D.III was flown from L 35 (LZ 80) to become the first parasite fighter flying from an airship (January 26, 1918)
- A Sopwith Camel was flown from airship HMA 23 (1918)
- A Sperry Messenger biplane was launched and recovered by non-rigid airships Tc-3 and Tc-7 (1923)
- Several DH 53 Hummingbird monoplanes were launched and recovered by airship R33 (1924), followed by two Gloster Grebe fighters (1925).
- A glider and a biplane were recovered by the USS Los Angeles. These were followed by the F9C Sparrowhawk escort fighter which flew operationally from USS Akron and Macon (1935).
- Ohka Rocket plane on the Mitsubishi G4M.
- Short S.20 and Short S.21 composite used for transatlantic mail (1937).
- The Polikarpov I-16 modified into a dive bomber carrying two 250 kg bombs (variant TsKB-29), flown from a Tupolev TB-3 as the Zveno-SPB ("composite dive bomber"), was the first parasite aircraft to see combat (1941)
- The Messerschmitt Me 328 escort fighter was intended to fly from the Dornier Do 217/Heinkel He 274, but this was unsuccessful due to engine problems.
- The XF-85 Goblin was an attempt to equip B-36 bombers with their own escort fighters, it was also the smallest plane to ever been flown in the airforce (1948)
- The RF-84K was a more successful attempt to provide the B-36 with a parasite escort fighter in the FICON project (1952)

== Gallery ==
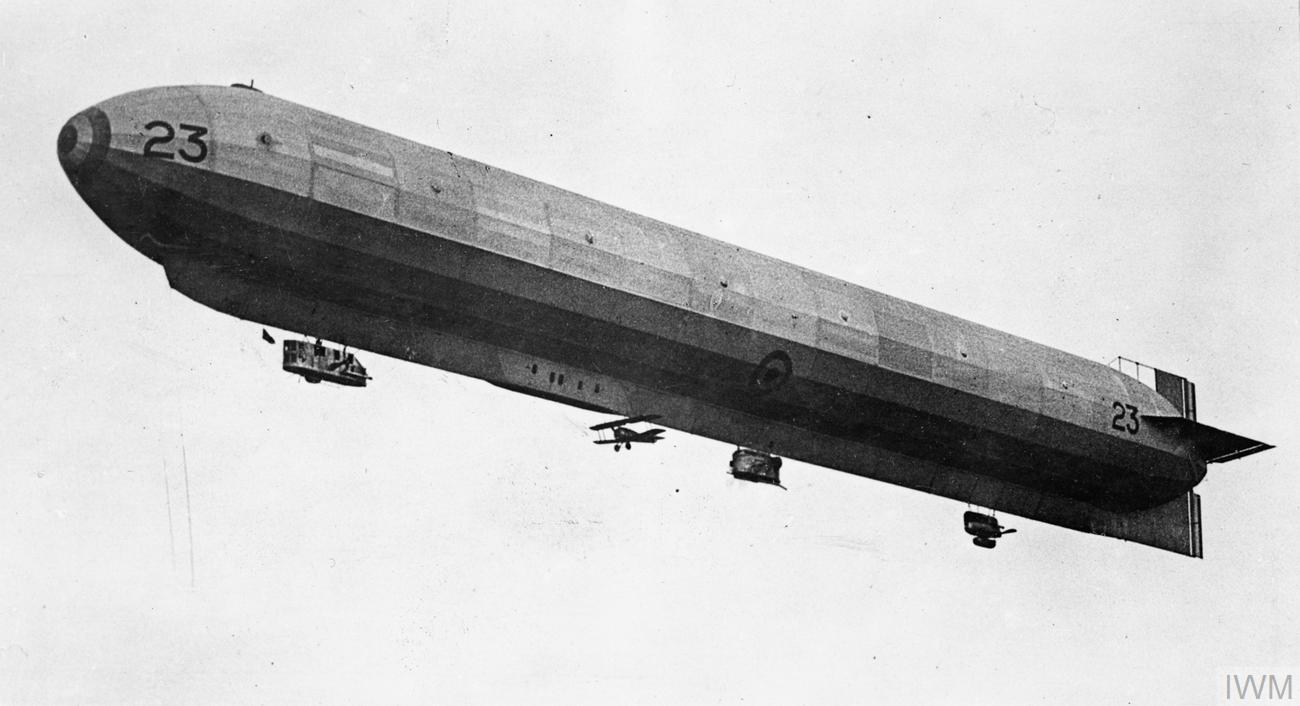
HM Airship 23r with underslung Sopwith Camel in 1918.

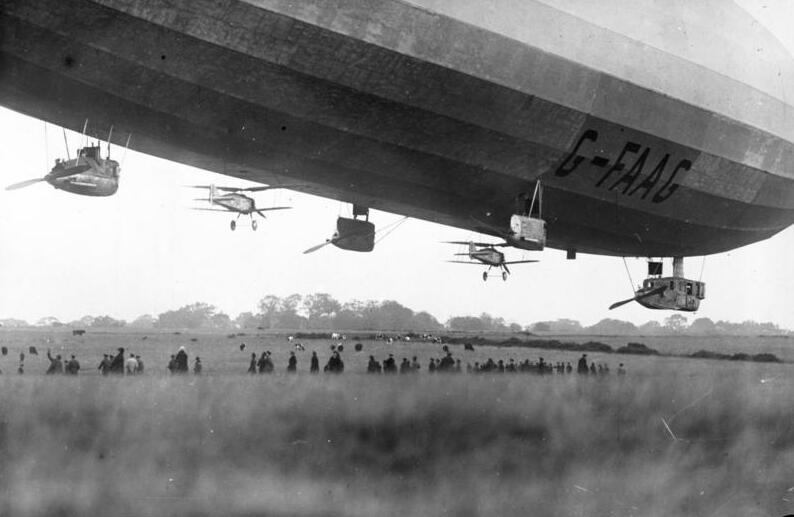
R33 with Gloster Grebe fighters in 1926

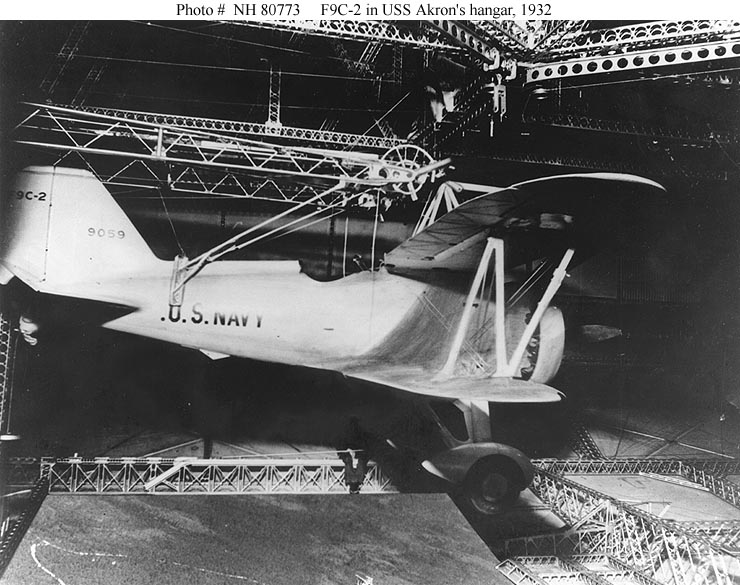
F9C Sparrowhawk inside Akron's hangar, 1932

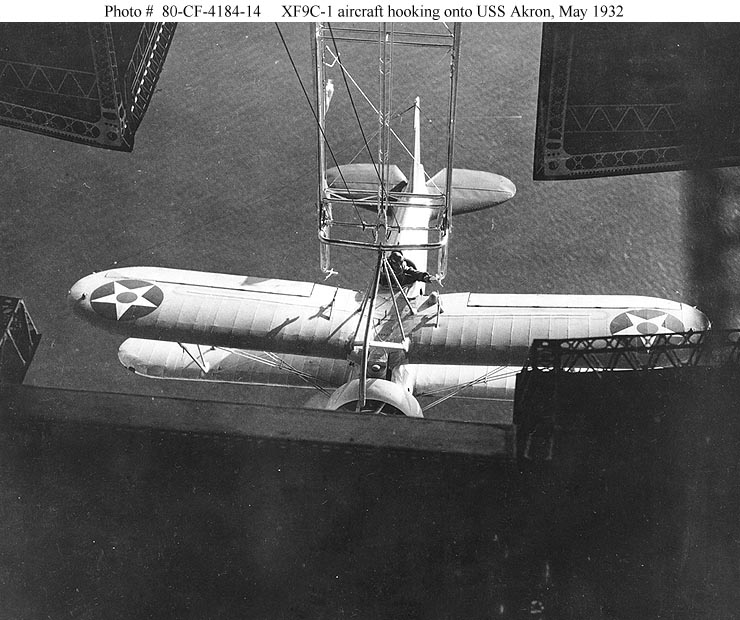
F9C Sparrowhawk successfully hooks on to Akron trapeze, May 1932

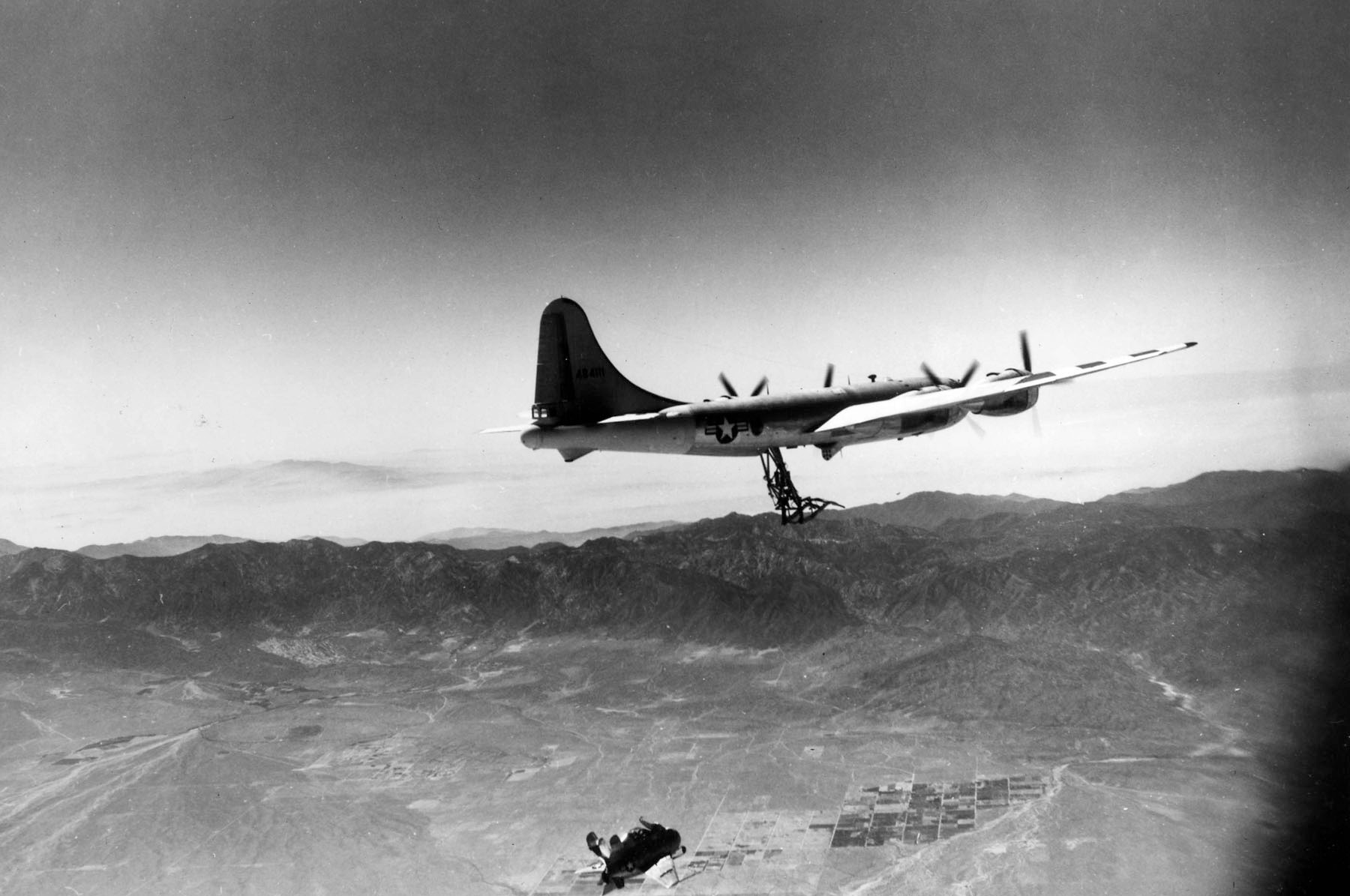
Boeing EB-29 with recovery trapeze deployed for FIghter CONveyer (FICON) trials with McDonnell XF-85 Goblin parasite fighter

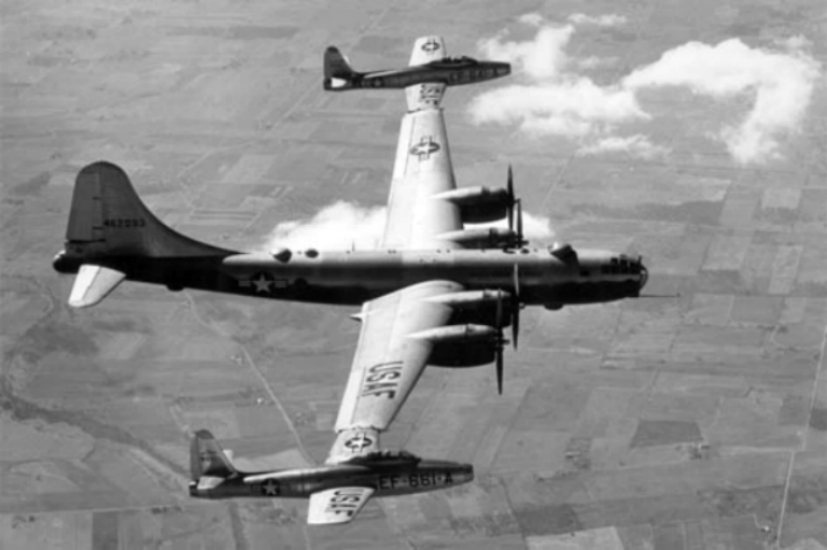
EB-29A docked wingtip-to-wingtip with two EF-84Ds in Project Tip Tow, 1950

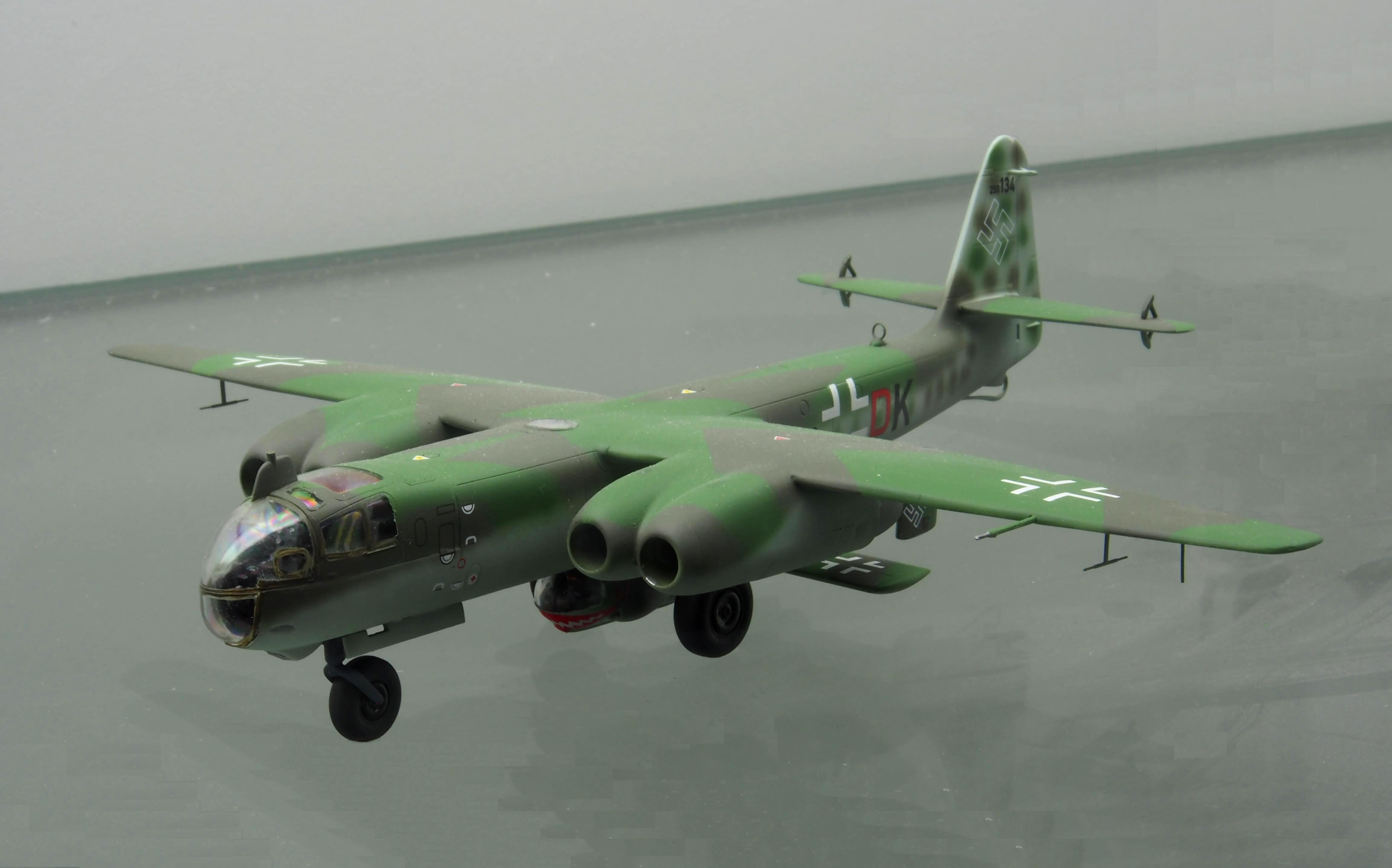
Model of an Arado Ar 234 V21 carrying an Arado E.381 at the Technikmuseum Speyer

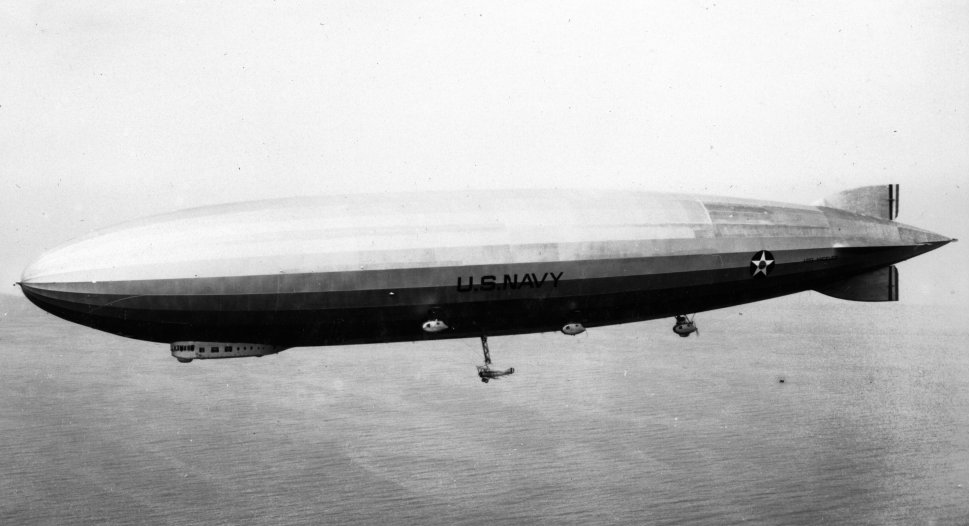
The USS Los Angeles in flight with attached fighter

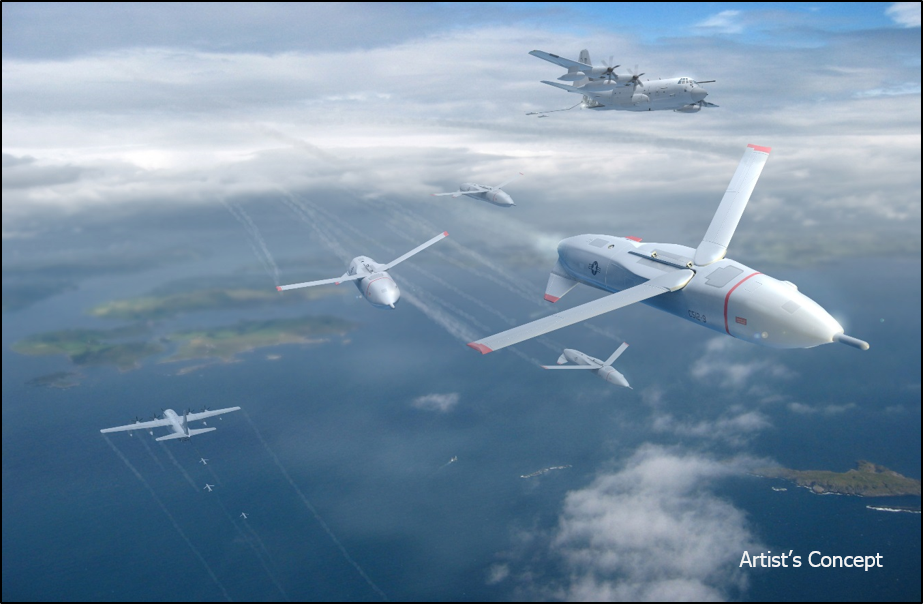
Project Gremlin of DARPA

== See also ==
- Index of aviation articles
- Mistel – German World War II project in which a piloted fighter aimed, then released, a pilotless ("bunker-buster") bomber with an explosive warhead in its nose

== Bibliography ==
- Hallstead, William F. (2001). "Parasite Aircraft". Aviation History. 12 (2): 38–45. ISSN 1076-8858.
- Lesnitchenko, Vladimir (November–December 1999). "Combat Composites: Soviet Use of 'Mother-ships' to Carry Fighters, 1939–1941". Air Enthusiast (84): 4–21. ISSN 0143-5450.
