= Tupolev TB-3 =

Soviet heavy bomber aircraft

TB-3 (ANT-6)
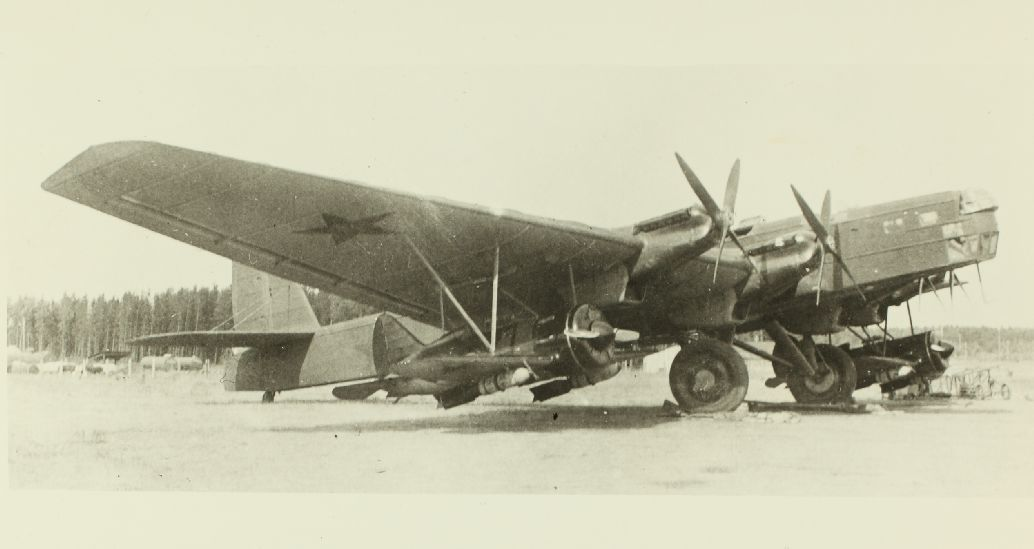
- TB-3 in Zveno configuration

General information
- Type: Heavy bomber
- Manufacturer: Voronezh Aircraft Production Association
- Designer: Andrei Tupolev (Note: overall concept)
- Primary users: Soviet Air Force (VVS) Aeroflot
- Number built: 818

History
- Manufactured: 1932–1934, 1935–1937
- Introduction date: 1932
- First flight: 22 December 1930
- Retired: 1945 (Soviet Air Force)
- Developed from: Tupolev TB-1
- Developed into: Tupolev ANT-16

The Tupolev TB-3, (Note: Russian: Тяжёлый Бомбардировщик, Tyazhyolyy Bombardirovshchik, "heavy bomber") OKB designation ANT-6, was a monoplane heavy bomber deployed by the Soviet Air Force in the 1930s and used during the early years of World War II. It was one of the world's first cantilever wing four-engine heavy bombers. Despite obsolescence and being officially withdrawn from service in 1939, the TB-3 performed bomber and transport duties throughout much of World War II. The TB-3 also saw combat as a Zveno project fighter mothership and as a light tank transport.

== Development ==
In 1925, the Soviet Air Force approached TsAGI with a requirement for a heavy bomber with total engine output of 1,500 kW (2,000 hp) and either wheeled or float landing gear. Tupolev OKB started design work in 1926 with the government operational requirements finalized in 1929. The Tupolev TB-1 was taken as the basis for the design and the aircraft was initially powered by 440 kW (590 hp) Curtiss V-1570 "Conqueror" engines, with the intent of switching to Mikulin M-17s (modified BMW VIs) in production. The mock-up was approved on 21 March 1930 and the first prototype was completed on 31 October 1930. The aircraft flew on 22 December 1930 with Mikhail Gromov at the controls and with ski landing gear. Despite almost crashing owing to vibration causing the throttles to close, the test flight was a success. On 20 February 1931, the Soviet Air Force approved mass production of the ANT-6 with M-17 engines.

The prototype was refitted with 540 kW (720 hp) BMW VIz 500 engines, larger radiators, and wooden fixed-pitch propellers of TsAGI design. The single-wheel landing gear was deemed too weak and was replaced by tandem bogies with 1,350 mm × 300 mm (53 in × 12 in) tires. The first pre-production TB-3 4M-17 flew on 4 January 1932 with Andrey Yumashev and I. F. Petrov at the controls. Unexpectedly, subsequent mass-produced aircraft were found to be 10–12% heavier than the prototype, which significantly hampered performance. The discrepancy was discovered to be due to high positive tolerances on raw materials which resulted in steel sheetmetal, pipes, and wires being much thicker than on the carefully constructed prototypes. The aircraft were also more crudely painted with a thick layer of camouflage and lacquer. The factories asked the workers for suggestions on reducing the weight, paying 100 roubles for each 1 kg (2.2 lb) removed from the aircraft. In combination with OKB efforts, this resulted in weight savings of almost 1,000 kg (2,200 lb). Despite this, production aircraft could differ from each other by as much as several hundred kilograms.

In 1933, a single TB-3 4M-17F was streamlined with the removal of turrets and bomb shackles, covering all openings, and fitting wheel spats. This resulted in only a 4.5% increase in top speed and a similar increase in the range. Tupolev concluded that streamlining was minimally beneficial for large and slow aircraft. To study the effect of corrugated skin, in January–February 1935 a single TB-3 4AM-34R had the corrugations incrementally covered with fabric. This resulted in a 5.5% gain in top speed and a 27.5% increase in the ceiling. The same aircraft demonstrated a significant increase in climb rate when fitted with experimental four-blade propellers.

Record flights

- TB-3 4M-34R set a flight endurance record of 18 hours and 30 minutes.
- TB-3 4AM-34FRN with Andrey Yumashev at the controls set a number of payload-to-altitude records:
  - 11 September 1936 – 5,000 kg (11,000 lb) to 8,116 m (26,627 ft), improved to 8,980 m (29,460 ft) on 28 October.
  - 16 September 1936 – 10,000 kg (22,000 lb) to 6,605 m (21,670 ft)
  - 20 September 1936 – 12,000 kg (26,000 lb) to 2,700 m (8,900 ft)

== Design ==
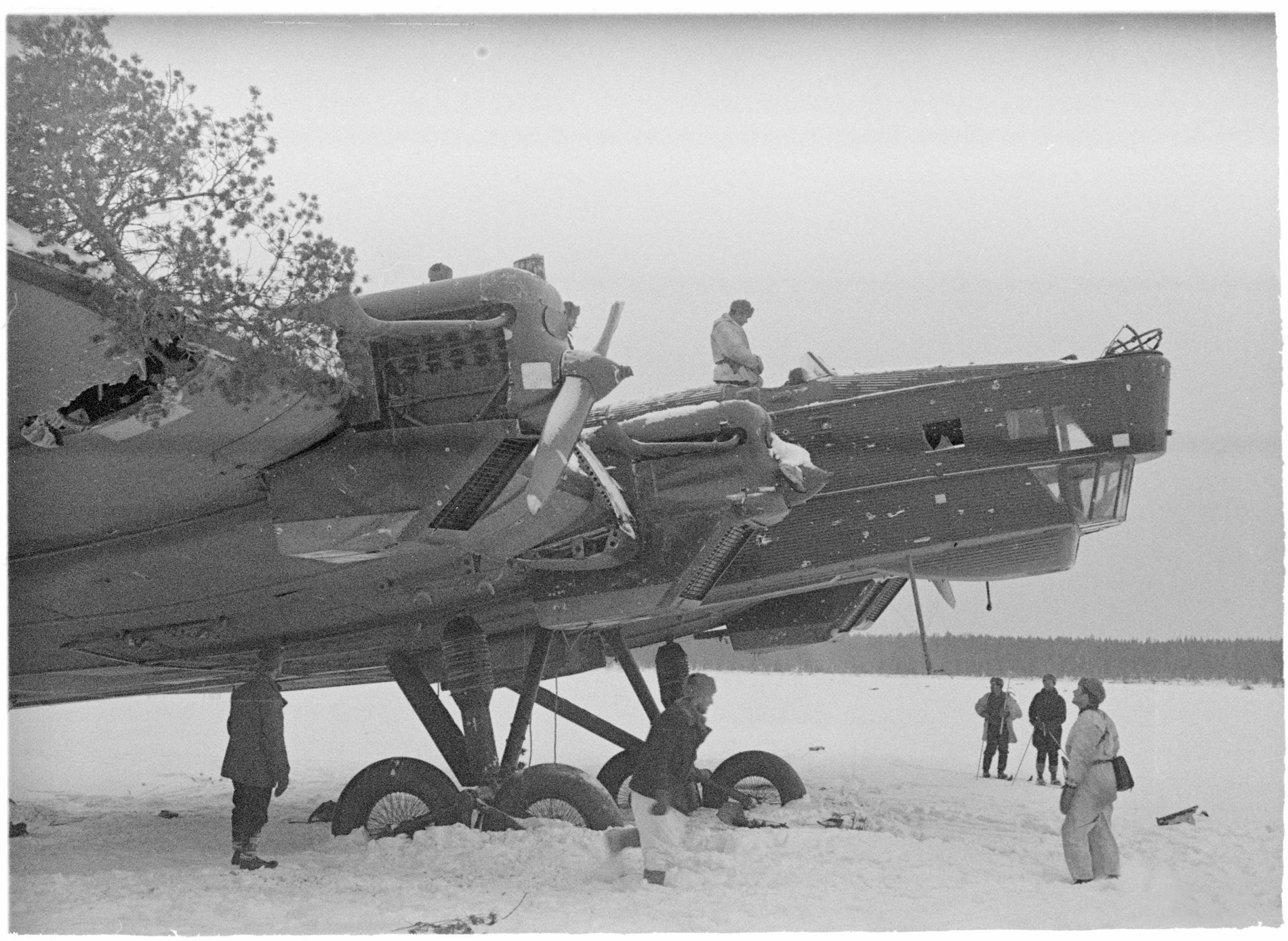
TB-3 after emergency landing during the Winter War in March 1940

The TB-3 was an all-metal aircraft of steel construction, as one of the designs from Andrei Tupolev's design bureau to be based on the 1918-onward all-metal aircraft design practices and technology pioneered by Hugo Junkers. The frame was composed of V-section beams covered with non-stressed corrugated skin ranging from 0.3 mm (0.012 in) to 0.8 mm (0.031 in) in thickness. The corrugations were 13 mm (0.51 in) deep and 50 mm (1.97 in) apart. The cantilever wing was supported by four tube-section spars. In 1934, thanks to the development of stronger steel alloys, the wingspan was increased from 39.5 to 41.85 m (129 ft 7 in to 137 ft 4 in) with a concurrent wing area increase from 230 to 234.5 m^{2} (2,476 to 2,524 sq ft). Any part of the aircraft could be walked on in soft shoes without damaging the skin, and the leading edges of the wings swung down to form walkways for engine maintenance. Controls were cable-actuated with a variable-incidence tailplane and a trim compensation system in case of engine failures on one side. Fixed main landing gear was not fitted with brakes. The fuel tanks did not have fire or leak protection, although the engines had an internal fire-extinguishing system. The M-17 engines were tuned to provide a maximum theoretical range of 3,250 km (1,750 nmi; 2,020 mi) without spark plug or carburetor fouling. Defensive armament consisted of light machine guns in five turrets — one in the nose, two on top of mid-fuselage, and one retractable "dustbin" under each wing between the engine nacelles. Later variants moved one of the top fuselage turrets aft of the tail fin.

== Operational history ==
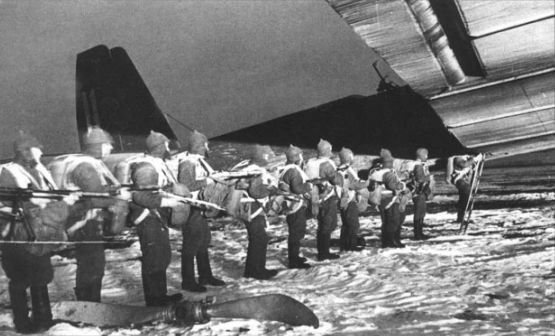
Soviet paratroopers boarding TB-3 transport

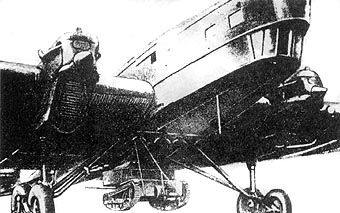
TB-3 carrying a T-27 tankette

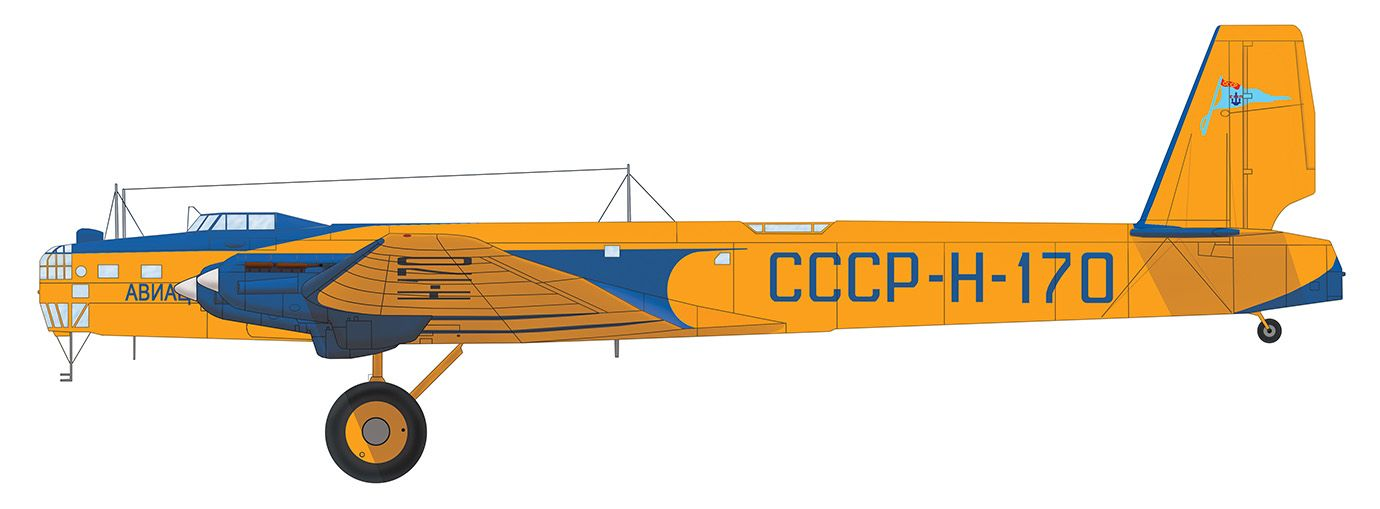
Tupolev ANT-6A of the Soviet organization Glavsevmorput (GUSMP)

The TB-3 was used operationally during the Battle of Khalkhin Gol against Japan and in the Winter War with Finland. Although it was officially withdrawn from service in 1939, at the start of the Great Patriotic War on 22 June 1941, the Soviet Air Force had 516 operational TB-3s, with an additional 25 operated by the Soviet Navy. Stationed far from the USSR's western border, the ТB-3s avoided catastrophic losses during the first German air strikes, after which TB-3s from 3rd TBAP (Heavy Bomber Regiment) began flying night bombing missions on 23 June. A shortage of combat-ready aircraft also required daytime use of TB-3s without fighter escort and in this role the bombers, operating at low-to-medium altitudes, suffered heavy losses to enemy fighters and ground fire. By August 1941, TB-3s made up 25% of the Soviet bomber force and, operated by elite air force crews, were flying up to three combat missions per night. The aircraft participated in all major battles through 1943, including the first Battle of Smolensk, the Battle of Moscow, the Battle of Stalingrad, the Siege of Leningrad, and the Battle of Kursk. On 1 July 1945, 18th Air Army still had ten TB-3s on the active roster.

The TB-3 served extensively as a cargo and paratroop transport, carrying up to 35 soldiers in the latter role. In the first five months of the war, the aircraft transported 2,797 t (6,166,000 lb) of cargo and 2,300 personnel.

The TB-3 was also used in several special projects as a fighter mothership in the Zveno project and for delivering light T-27, T-37, and T-38 tanks. On 1 August 1941, a pair of TB-3s in Zveno-SPB configuration, each with two Polikarpov I-16 fighters carrying a pair of 250 kg (550 lb) bombs, destroyed an oil depot with no losses in the port of Constanța, Romania. On 11 and 13 August 1941, Zveno-SPB successfully damaged the King Carol I Bridge over the Danube in Romania. Zveno operations ended in the autumn of 1942 due to the vulnerability of the motherships.

In recognition of the role TB-3 played during the war, three aircraft were included in the first post-war air parade on 18 June 1945.

== Surviving aircraft ==
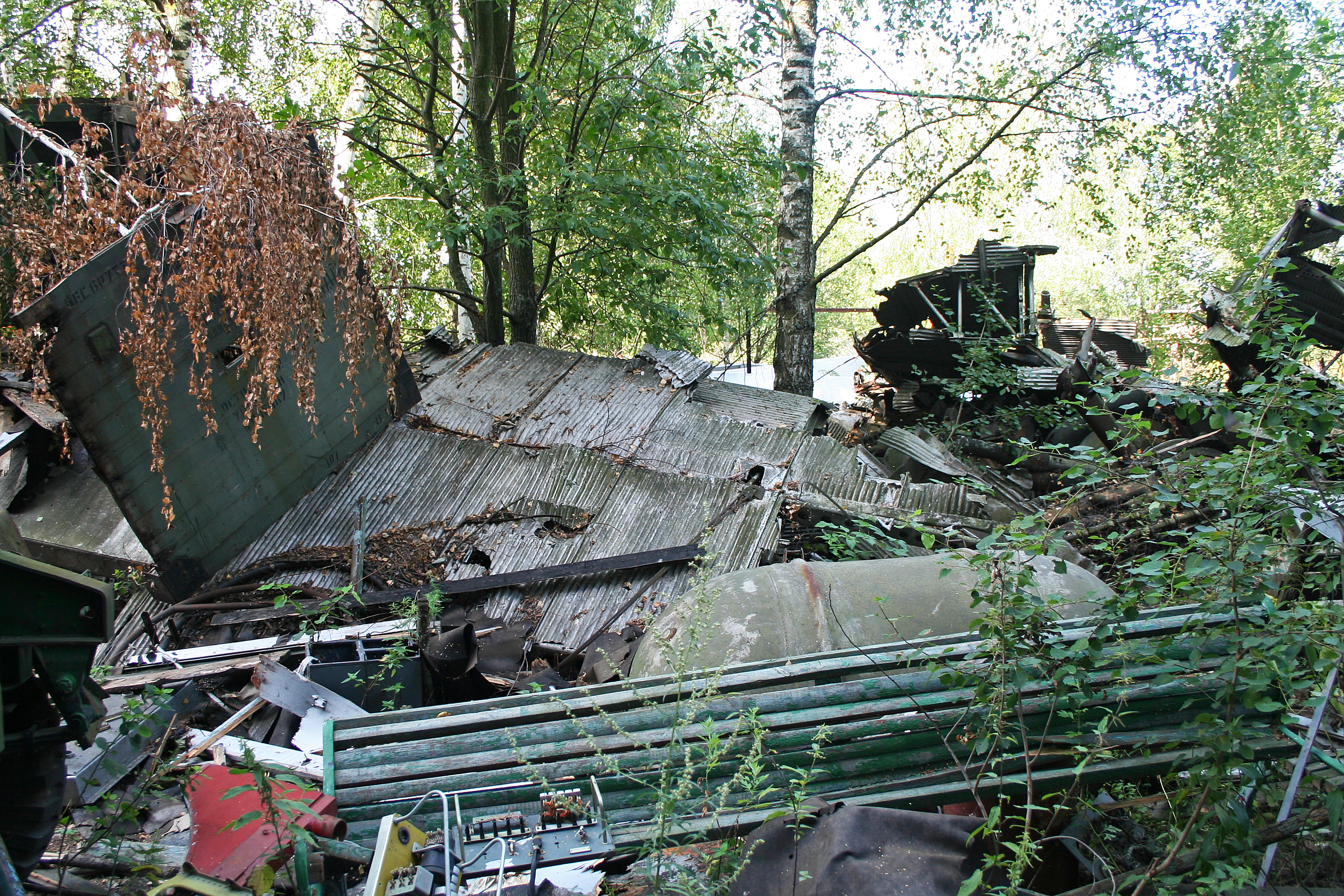
Wreckage of what is believed to be a Tupolev TB-3 outside the Central Air Force Museum

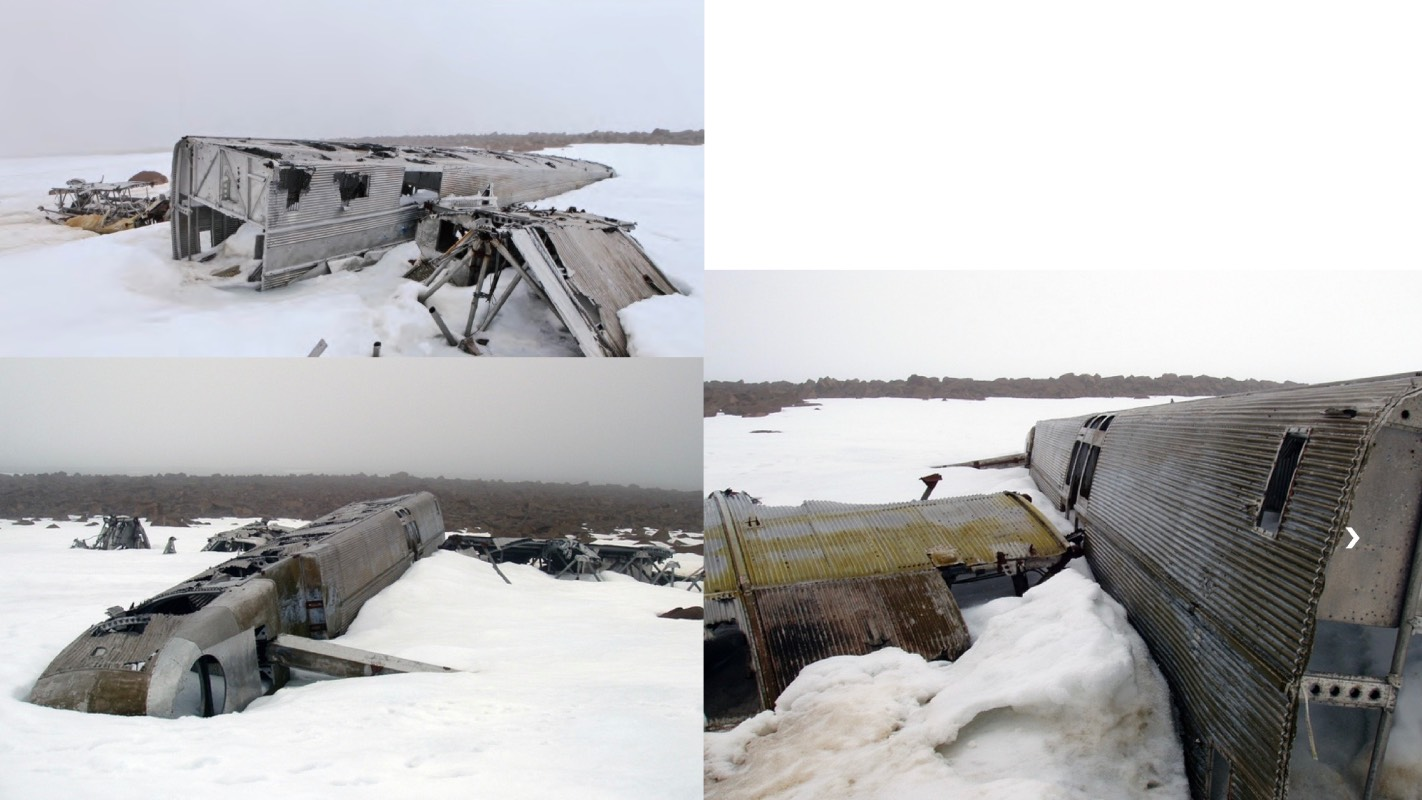
Wreckage of aircraft CCCP-N210 at Bukhta Teplits

There are no complete surviving Tupolev TB-3s today as all of them were scrapped in the 1950s however the wreckage of what is believed to be a TB-3 is located at the Central Air Force Museum The wreckage of Tupolev TB-3 registration CCCP-N210 which crashed on approach at Bukhta Teplits in 1938 remains in much better condition as of 2006 with a mostly intact fuselage.

== Variants ==
TB-3 4AM-34FRN in Zveno-SPB configuration with Polikarpov I-16 fighters armed with FAB-250 bombs

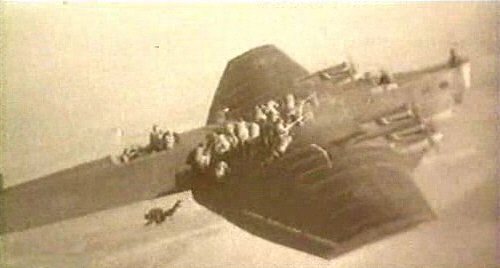
Paratroopers jumping from Tupolev TB-3

Source: Shavrov

TB-3 4M-17F
The first production version, comprised about half of all TB-3s built.
TB-3 4M-34
Mikulin AM-34 engines with revised radiators, added oil coolers, several dozen built.
TB-3 4M-34R
Mikulin AM-34R engines with reduction gearboxes providing significantly improved performance, additional turret aft of the tail fin, tail wheels with hydraulic brakes, aerodynamic refinements of the wing-fuselage join and radiators, retractable wind generators.
TB-3 4AM-34RD
A series of long-range demonstration aircraft with streamlined fuselages and wheel brakes. Some aircraft had single main gear wheels 2 m (6 ft 7 in) in diameter and three-blade metal propellers. Used for flights to Warsaw, Paris, and Rome in 1933–1934.
TB-3 4AM-34RN
High-altitude version with AM-34RN engines, four-blade propellers on inboard engines and two-blade on outboard, 2 m (6 ft 7 in) single main wheels, turrets upgraded to ShKAS machine guns, top speed 288 km/h (179 mph) at 4,200 m (13,800 ft), service ceiling 7,740 m (25,390 ft). Tested in August–October 1935 but did not enter production as the basic TB-3 design was becoming obsolete.
TB-3 4AM-34FRN/FRNV
AM-34FRN/FRNV engines with increased power output and four-blade propellers, aerodynamic refinements including streamlined turrets, 2 m (6 ft 7 in) main wheels with brakes, top speed over 300 km/h (190 mph).
TB-3D
Proposed variant with Charomsky AN-1 diesel engines of 550 kW (740 hp) and projected range of 4,280 km (2,660 mi), did not enter production as other performance characteristics were inferior to TB-3 4AM-34RN.
G-2
Retired TB-3s with M-17 and M-34 engines converted for freight duties with Aeroflot
ANT-6-4M-34R "Aviaarktika"
TB-3 modified for the 1937 expedition to the North Pole with enclosed cockpit, single 2 m (6 ft 7 in) main wheels, three-blade metal propellers.

== Operators ==
China

- Chinese Nationalist Air Force

Soviet Union

- Aeroflot
- Soviet Air Force
- Soviet Naval Aviation

== Accidents and incidents ==
17 March 1938
A Polyarnaya Aviatsiya G-2 (CCCP-N210) crashed on landing at Bukhta Teplits; ground fog forced the crew to perform a go-around. As a result of poor CRM the aircraft re-entered the fog. Descent was continued until the left landing ski struck snow, ripping off the landing gear and causing the aircraft to crash; all seven on board survived, but the aircraft was written off.
14 March 1941
An Aeroflot G-2 (CCCP-L1496) stalled and crashed near Begovat, Uzbekistan after the pilot attempted to climb following a loss of altitude caused by severe turbulence, killing the six crew. The aircraft was operating a Tashkent–Fergana cargo service.
27 August 1941
An Aeroflot G-2 (CCCP-L1996) struck a hill near Kizyl-Arvat, Turkmenistan while attempting to make a forced landing after the crew failed to locate their destination, killing six of nine on board. The aircraft was operating a Tashkent–Ashgabat cargo service.
26 December 1941
An Aeroflot G-2 (CCCP-L3043) crashed near Dmitriyevka (now Bayserke), Kazakhstan after the aircraft lost altitude while turning, killing 26 of 34 on board. The aircraft was operating an Alma-Ata (now Almaty)–Karaganda–Kazan passenger service with high-ranking Kazakh party and state officials. This crash is the deadliest involving the G-2.
29 December 1941
An Aeroflot G-2 (CCCP-L2010) crashed in the Amu Darya River near Chardzhou Airport after the aircraft rapidly lost altitude due to spatial disorientation of the pilot, killing seven of 36 on board. The aircraft was operating a Chardzhou–Urgench passenger service.

== Specifications (TB-3 4M-17F, 1934 model) ==
Tupolev TB-3

Data from Shavrov

General characteristics

- Crew: 8-10
- Length: 24.4 m (80 ft 1 in)
- Wingspan: 41.8 m (137 ft 2 in)
- Height: 8.5 m (27 ft 11 in)
- Wing area: 234.5 m^{2} (2,524 sq ft)
- Airfoil: Tupolev A0 (20%); tip: Tupolev A0 (10%)
- Empty weight: 11,200 kg (24,692 lb)
- Gross weight: 17,200 kg (37,920 lb)
- Max takeoff weight: 19,300 kg (42,549 lb)
- Powerplant: 4 × Mikulin M-17F V-12 liquid-cooled piston engine 715 PS (705 hp; 526 kW) each
- Propellers: 2-bladed fixed-pitch propellers

Performance

- Maximum speed: 212 km/h (132 mph, 114 kn)
- Range: 2,000 km (1,200 mi, 1,100 nmi)
- Service ceiling: 4,800 m (15,700 ft)
- Rate of climb: 1.25 m/s (246 ft/min)
- Time to altitude: 1,000 m (3,300 ft) in 4 minutes

3,000 m (9,800 ft) in 22 minutes

- Wing loading: 73 kg/m^{2} (15 lb/sq ft)
- Power/mass: 0.15 kW/kg (0.091 hp/lb)
- Take-off run: 300 m (980 ft)
- Landing run: 330 m (1,080 ft)

Armament

- Guns: 6–8 × 7.62×54mmR DA machine guns, 100 63-round magazines
- Bombs: Up to 5,000 kg (11,000 lb) of bombs standard load

== See also ==
Aircraft of comparable role, configuration, and era

- Mitsubishi Ki-20
- SAB AB-20

Related lists

- List of interwar military aircraft
- List of aircraft of World War II
- List of military aircraft of the Soviet Union and the CIS
- List of bomber aircraft
