= Riverview High School (Pennsylvania) =

Coordinates: 40.52562°N 79.84335°W

Riverview Junior-Senior High School
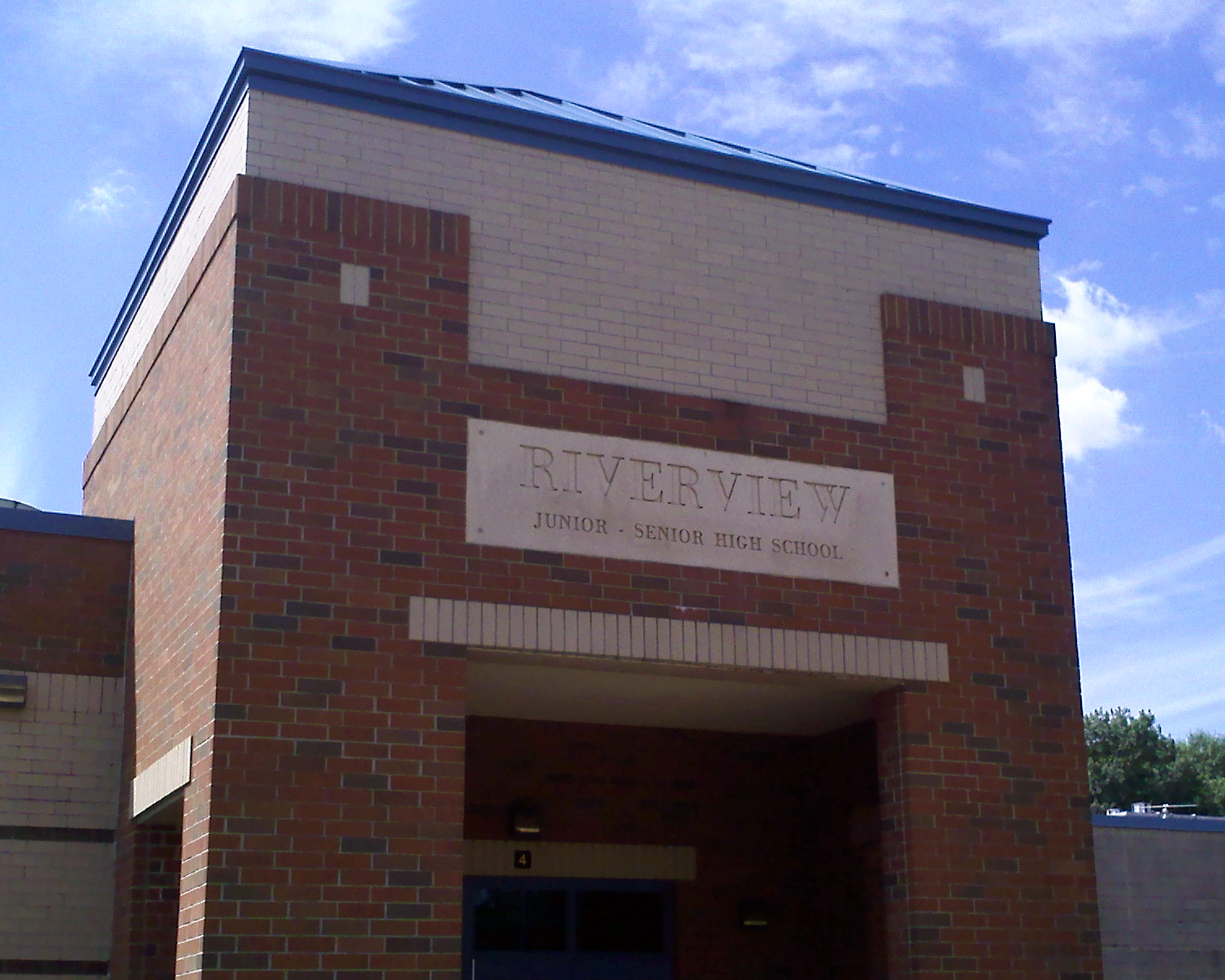

Location
- 100 Hulton Road; Oakmont, Pennsylvania; United States

Information
- Type: Public High School
- Principal: Eric Hewitt
- Staff: 93
- Grades: 7–12
- Gender: Coeducational
- Enrollment: 398 (2021-22)
- Campus type: Suburb
- Colors: Black and yellow
- Athletics: Yes
- Athletics conference: WPIAL
- Team name: Raiders
- Rival: Springdale Jr-Sr High School
- Website: Riverview High School

Riverview Junior-Senior High School (RHS) is a public school located in Oakmont, Pennsylvania. The school has a total enrollment of approximately 430 students from grades 7-12, and is part of the Riverview School District, serving Oakmont and Verona. The school offers a variety of academic programs, including Advanced Placement courses, dual enrollment opportunities, and vocational education programs. In addition to its academic offerings, Riverview Jr-Sr High School has a number of extracurricular activities, including sports teams, clubs, and organizations for students to get involved in. The school is also known for its strong music program, which includes a marching band, concert band, and choir. Riverview Junior-Senior High School is also known for their theatrical performances or musicals.

== Academics ==
Riverview Junior-Senior High School currently employs approximately 60 teachers, including Principal Eric Hewitt, among four core subjects (Mathematics, English, social studies, and the sciences), foreign languages Spanish and French, as well as special education staff and tutors.

== Athletics ==
Currently, Riverview Junior-Senior High School has over 15 sports teams for fall, winter, and spring sports.

=== Fall Sports ===
- Golf
- Boys Cross-Country
- Girls Cross-Country
- Football
- Boys Soccer
- Girls Soccer
- Cheerleading
- Girls Tennis
- Girls Volleyball

=== Winter Sports ===
- Boys Basketball
- Girls Basketball
- Wrestling
- Bowling

=== Spring Sports ===
- Baseball
- Softball
- Boys Track & Field
- Girls Track & Field
- Boys Tennis

== Clubs ==
Riverview Junior-Senior High School has 17 clubs that integrate with a multitude of electives and courses.

- Model United Nations
- Art Club
- Builder's Club
- Chorus
- Dance Club
- Drama Club
- Ecology Club
- French Club
- Graphics and Design Club
- Junior/Senior Class
- Key Club
- National Honor Society
- Raidervision
- REAP
- Robotics
- SADD
- Ski Club
- Spanish Club
- Student Council
- Musical

== Notable alumni ==
- Tim Kaiser - Television producer
