= Verona, Pennsylvania =

Borough in Pennsylvania, US

- Borough
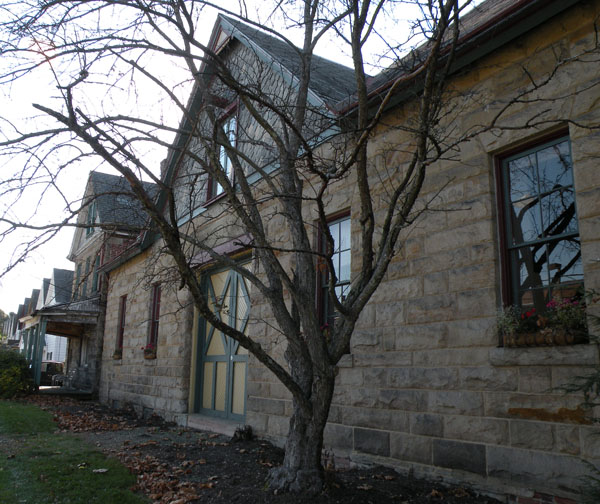
- Lehner Grain-and-Cider Mill

- Location in Allegheny County and the U.S. state of Pennsylvania.
- Coordinates: 40°30′18″N 79°50′27″W
- Country: United States
- State: Pennsylvania
- County: Allegheny
- Settled: 1769
- Incorporated: 1871

Government
  - Mayor: David Ricupero (D)

Area
  - Total: 0.59 sq mi (1.54 km^{2})
  - Land: 0.51 sq mi (1.31 km^{2})
  - Water: 0.093 sq mi (0.24 km^{2})

Population (2020)
  - Total: 2,492
  - Density: 4,774.2/sq mi (1,843.34/km^{2})
- Time zone: UTC-5 (Eastern (EST))
  - Summer (DST): UTC-4 (EDT)
- ZIP codes: 15147
- Area code: 412
- FIPS code: 42-80032
- Website: veronaborough.org

Verona is a borough in Allegheny County, Pennsylvania, United States. It is 13 miles (21 km) northeast of downtown Pittsburgh, along the left bank of the Allegheny River. As of the 2020 census, the borough had a population of 2,492.

== History ==
Verona was named by creating a portmanteau of the names of the Verner and Iona railroad stops along the Allegheny Valley Railroad. James Verner was the town's founder.

== Industry ==
Formerly, railroad shops, tool works, lumber yards, steel-casting works, structural iron works, and a chemical plant operated in the borough. Woodings-Verona Tool Works, Inc. once produced tools in the borough along Jones Street. Producing Daily's cocktail mixes and Little Hugs, American Beverage Corporation currently has a large-scale production facility where the train roundhouse once stood next to Plum Creek. Bunting Graphics, Inc. also has operation in Verona. Bunting Graphics has supplied signage and architecture around the world, including for the National Parks System. In 1900, the number of people living in Verona was 1,904; the population increased to 2,849 in 1910.

== Education ==
Verona is served by the Riverview School District.

== Government and politics ==
Presidential election results
Year	Republican	Democratic	Third parties
2020	42% 552	55% 725	1% 21
2016	42% 475	56% 632	2% 21
2012	40% 405	59% 603	1% 17

== Geography ==
Verona is located at 40°30′18″N 79°50′27″W (40.504882, −79.840935).

According to the United States Census Bureau, the borough has a total area of 0.6 square miles (1.6 km^{2}), of which 0.5 square miles (1.3 km^{2}) is land and 0.1 square miles (0.26 km^{2}), or 14.29%, is water.

=== Streams ===
Plum Creek flows through the borough.

== Surrounding communities ==
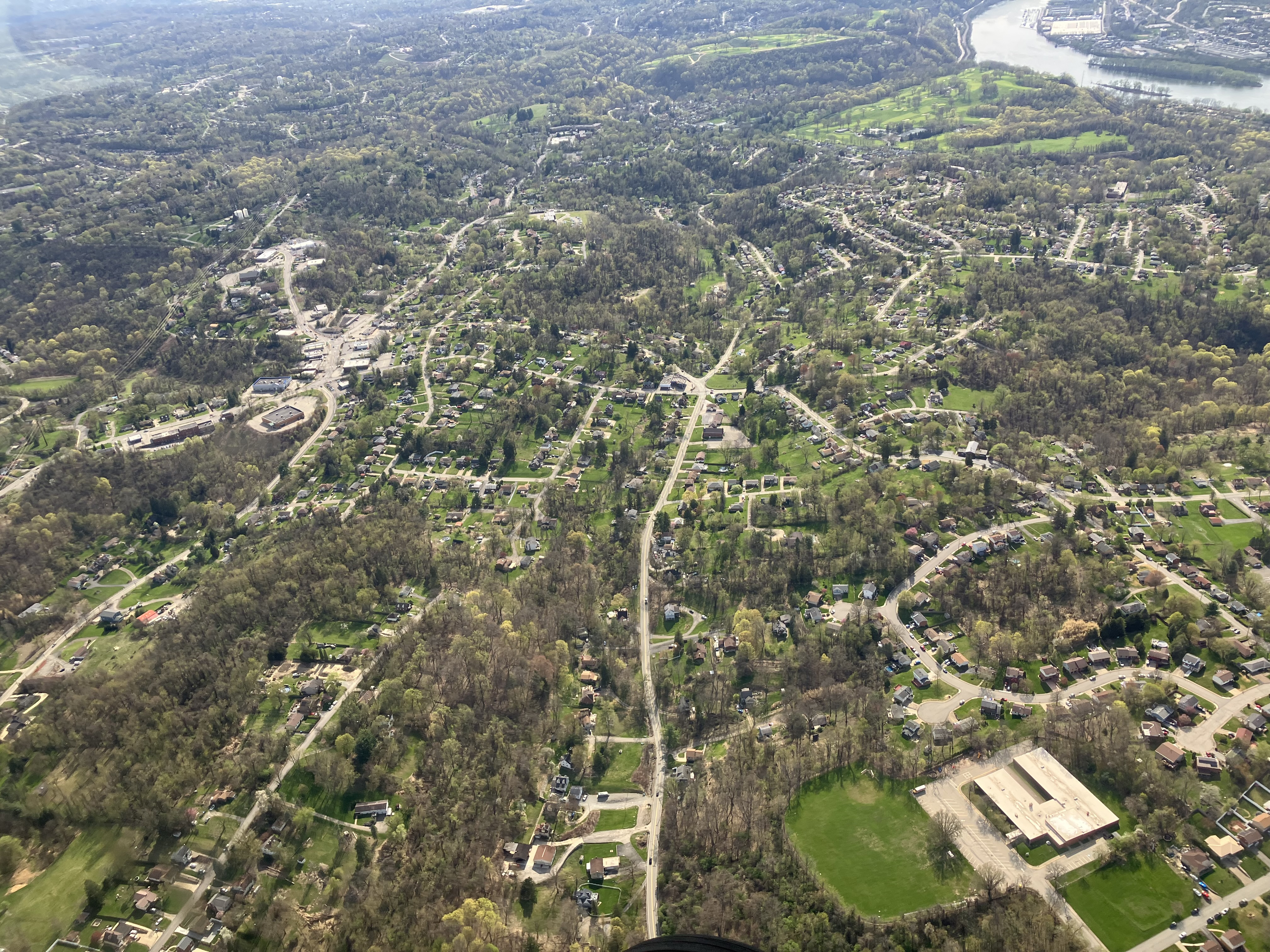
1500ft above the surface

Verona is bordered by Oakmont to the north and Penn Hills Township to the east and south. To the west, across the Allegheny River, is O'Hara Township.

== Demographics ==
Historical population
Census	Pop.	Note	%±
1880	1,599		—
1890	1,477		−7.6%
1900	1,904		28.9%
1910	2,849		49.6%
1920	3,938		38.2%
1930	4,376		11.1%
1940	4,396		0.5%
1950	4,325		−1.6%
1960	4,032		−6.8%
1970	3,737		−7.3%
1980	3,179		−14.9%
1990	3,260		2.5%
2000	3,124		−4.2%
2010	2,474		−20.8%
2020	2,492		0.7%

As of the 2000 census, there were 3,124 people, 1,376 households, and 806 families residing in the borough. The population density was 5,841.0 inhabitants per square mile (2,255.2/km^{2}). There were 1,480 housing units at an average density of 2,767.2 per square mile (1,068.4/km^{2}). The racial makeup of the borough was 95.77% White, 3.07% African American, 0.13% Native American, 0.35% Asian, 0.16% from other races, and 0.51% from two or more races. Hispanic or Latino of any race were 0.32% of the population.

There were 1,376 households, out of which 28.6% had children under the age of 18 living with them, 36.8% were married couples living together, 16.3% had a female householder with no husband present, and 41.4% were non-families. 36.8% of all households were made up of individuals, and 16.2% had someone living alone who was 65 years of age or older. The average household size was 2.26 and the average family size was 2.98.

In the borough the population was spread out, with 23.9% under the age of 18, 8.1% from 18 to 24, 29.0% from 25 to 44, 21.4% from 45 to 64, and 17.6% who were 65 years of age or older. The median age was 39 years. For every 100 females there were 91.3 males. For every 100 females age 18 and over, there were 85.0 males.

The median income for a household in the borough was $28,245, and the median income for a family was $36,452. Males had a median income of $26,890 versus $25,462 for females. The per capita income for the borough was $15,881. About 10.0% of families and 14.1% of the population were below the poverty line, including 21.9% of those under age 18 and 16.6% of those age 65 or over.

== Notable people ==
- Frank Saddler, (9 September 1864 –25 March 1921) Broadway orchestrator and music arranger; lived in Verona during his childhood and early adulthood
- Dick Thornburgh, the 76th United States Attorney General, died at a retirement community here
