= Riverview School District (Pennsylvania) =

School district in Pennsylvania

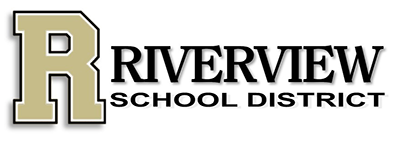

- Map of Allegheny County Pennsylvania School Districts

Address
- 701 10th Street Oakmont, Allegheny County, Pennsylvania, 15139; United States

District information
- Type: Public
- Grades: K-12

Other information
- Website: Riverview School District

The Riverview School District is a small, suburban public school district serving the Pittsburgh suburbs of Oakmont, Pennsylvania and Verona, Pennsylvania. Riverview School District encompasses approximately 2 square miles. According to 2014 federal census data, it serves a resident population of 8,900. In 2015, the district residents' per capita income was $31,812, while the median family income was $50,701.Riverview Jr-Sr High School is a small, 1st-tier Pittsburgh district serving the towns of Oakmont and Verona.

== Schools ==
- High School: Riverview Junior-Senior High School
- Elementary School(s): Tenth Street Elementary School and Verner Elementary School

== Student clubs and extracurriculars ==
Amnesty International, Art Club, Chorus, Dance Club, Designer's Club, Drama Club, Ecology Club, French Club, History Club, Jr High Student Council, SAEM, Key Club, Model UN, National Honor Society, PJAS. REAP, SADD, Spanish Club, Student Council, Yearbook.
