= Dr. Thomas R. Kerr House and Office =

Historic house in Pennsylvania, United States

- U.S. National Register of Historic Places
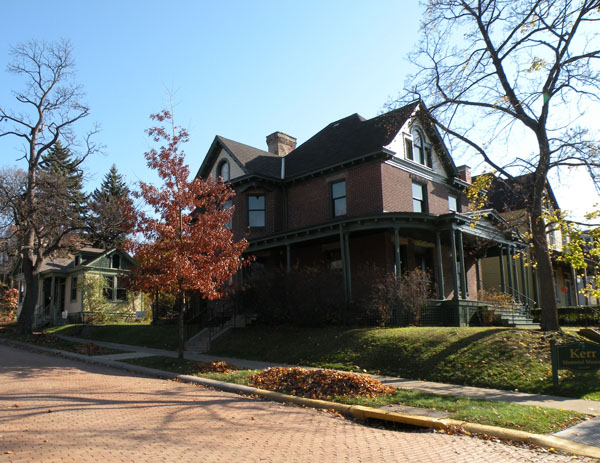

- Location within Pennsylvania Location within the United States
- Location: 438 4th Street, Oakmont, Pennsylvania, USA
- Coordinates: 40°31′2″N 79°50′26″W
- Built: 1897
- Architect: D.I. Kuhn
- Architectural style: Queen Anne
- NRHP reference No.: 03000885
- Added to NRHP: September 2, 2003

The Dr. Thomas R. Kerr House and Office at 438 4th Street in Oakmont, Pennsylvania, USA, was built in 1897. The Queen Anne house and the doctor's office behind the house were added to the National Register of Historic Places on September 2, 2003.

The building now houses the Kerr Memorial Museum which shows the upper middle class lives of the doctor, his wife Nellie, and their daughter Virginia, in the period of 1900–1910. Virginia taught English at the local schools for 42 years. She never married and donated the house to the Borough of Oakmont on her death in 1994.
