= Oakmont, Pennsylvania =

Borough in Pennsylvania, US

- Borough
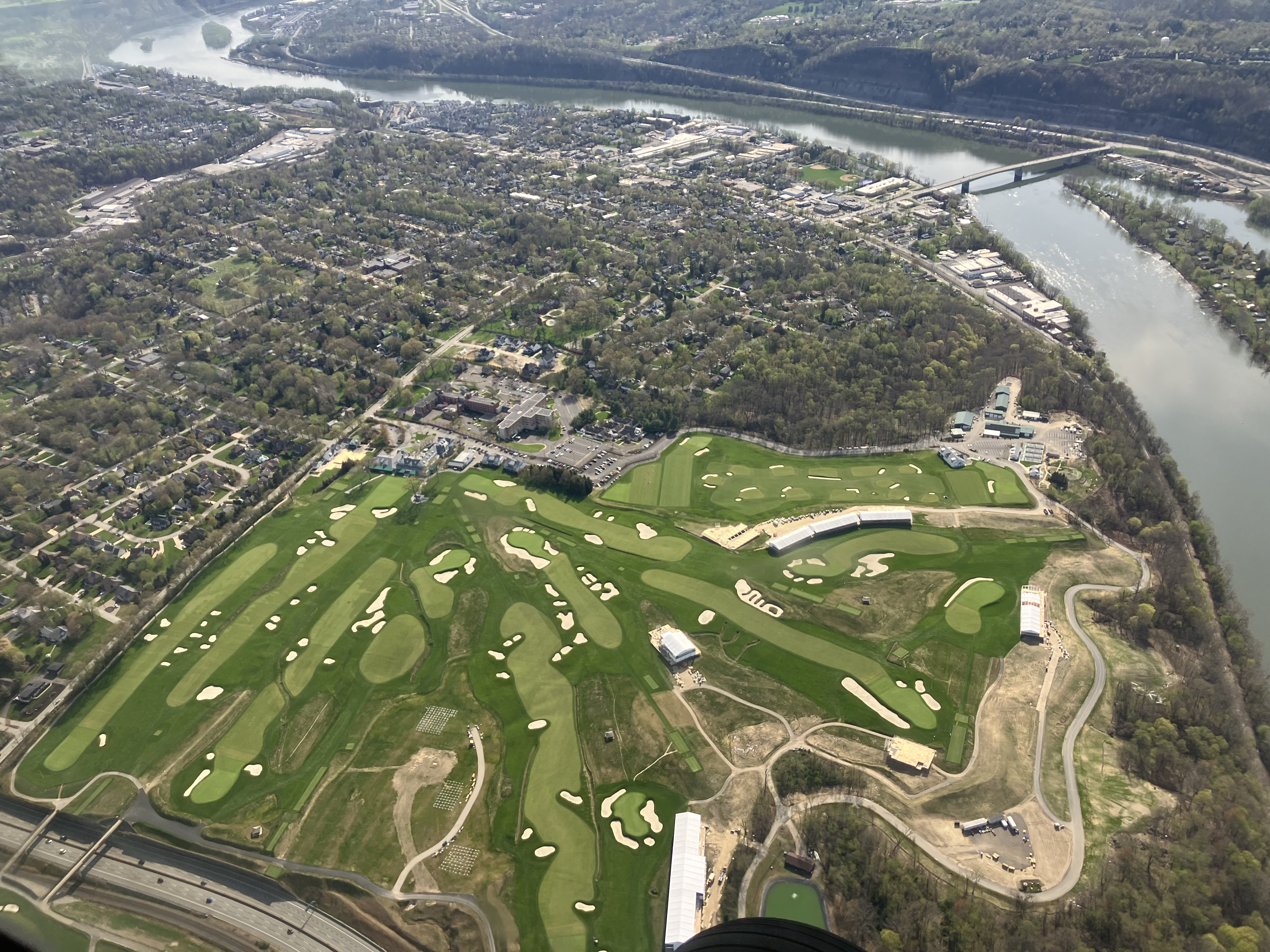
- Aerial photograph of Oakmont with Oakmont Country Club at bottom

- Flag Seal

- Location in Allegheny County, Pennsylvania

- Location within Pennsylvania Location within the United States
- Coordinates: 40°31′10″N 79°50′15″W
- Country: United States
- State: Pennsylvania
- County: Allegheny
- Founded 1816: Incorporated in 1889

Government
  - Mayor: Sophia Facaros (D)

Area
  - Total: 1.78 sq mi (4.60 km^{2})
  - Land: 1.58 sq mi (4.10 km^{2})
  - Water: 0.19 sq mi (0.49 km^{2})

Population (2020)
  - Total: 6,758
  - Density: 4,267.7/sq mi (1,647.75/km^{2})
- Time zone: UTC-5 (EST)
  - Summer (DST): UTC-4 (EDT)
- ZIP code: 15139
- Area codes: 412
- FIPS code: 42-56088
- Website: Oakmont, PA

Oakmont is a borough in Allegheny County, Pennsylvania, United States, along the Allegheny River. The population was 6,758 at the 2020 census. It is a suburb in the Pittsburgh metropolitan area. The borough is best known for the nearby Oakmont Country Club, a premier golf course that has been the site of numerous U.S. Open golf tournaments.

== History ==
Oakmont began in 1816 when a farmer, Michael Bright, bought a large tract of land 15 miles (24 km) northeast of Pittsburgh. The settlement took its name from a landmark tree, as the deed description reads, "Beginning at a black oak on the bank of the Allegheny River ..." It was incorporated in 1889.

The Edgewater Steel Company site was a 2.3-acre facility that underwent cleanup under the Environmental Protection Agency's Resource Conservation and Recovery Act (RCRA). Previously operated by Edgewater Steel until its shutdown in 2001, the site has seen various remediation efforts, including the closure of an EAF dust waste pile in 1991 and a construction/demolition waste landfill in 1995. While some hazardous waste was disposed of on-site during demolition in 2005, later testing found no significant contamination. The site was divided into two parcels, with remediation underway in the River Edge area and redevelopment of the Oakmont area. The site was converted into a residential, commercial, and light industrial area.

== Geography ==
Oakmont is located at 40°31′10″N 79°50′15″W (40.519518, −79.837620).

According to the United States Census Bureau, the borough has a total area of 1.8 square miles (4.7 km^{2}), of which 1.6 square miles (4.1 km^{2}) is land and 0.2 square miles (0.52 km^{2}), or 8.99%, is water. The business district of town is on relatively flat land near the Allegheny River, but the main residential area is on the upward slope headed toward Oakmont Country Club and the Pennsylvania Turnpike. Plum Creek flows through the borough.

Oakmont has three land borders, including Plum to the east, and Penn Hills and Verona to the south. Across the Allegheny River to the west and northwest, Oakmont runs adjacent with O'Hara Township to the west and Harmar Township to the north (via the Hulton Bridge).

== Demographics ==
Historical population
Census	Pop.	Note	%±
1890	1,678		—
1900	2,323		38.4%
1910	3,436		47.9%
1920	4,512		31.3%
1930	6,027		33.6%
1940	6,260		3.9%
1950	7,264		16.0%
1960	7,504		3.3%
1970	7,550		0.6%
1980	7,039		−6.8%
1990	6,961		−1.1%
2000	6,911		−0.7%
2010	6,303		−8.8%
2020	6,758		7.2%

As of the 2000 census, there were 6,911 people, 3,118 households, and 1,708 families residing in the borough. The population density was 4,250.0 inhabitants per square mile (1,640.9/km^{2}). There were 3,269 housing units at an average density of 2,010.3 per square mile (776.2/km^{2}). The racial makeup of the borough was 97.84% White, 0.90% African American, 0.10% Native American, 0.49% Asian, 0.17% from other races, and 0.49% from two or more races. Hispanic or Latino of any race were 0.62% of the population.

There were 3,118 households, out of which 21.7% had children under the age of 18 living with them, 43.3% were married couples living together, 9.0% had a female householder with no husband present, and 45.2% were non-families. 39.7% of all households were made up of individuals, and 18.1% had someone living alone who was 65 years of age or older. The average household size was 2.08 and the average family size was 2.84.

In the borough the population was spread out, with 19.3% under the age of 18, 4.5% from 18 to 24, 26.6% from 25 to 44, 24.2% from 45 to 64, and 25.4% who were 65 years of age or older. The median age was 45 years. For every 100 females, there were 79.2 males. For every 100 females age 18 and over, there were 74.0 males.

The median income for a household in the borough was $41,957, and the median income for a family was $57,821. Males had a median income of $42,152 versus $32,721 for females. The per capita income for the borough was $26,716. About 4.3% of families and 5.9% of the population were below the poverty line, including 7.5% of those under age 18 and 6.2% of those age 65 or over.

Presidential elections results
Year	Republican	Democratic	Third parties
2020	42% 1,949	56% 2,627	1% 49
2016	46% 1,754	53% 2,031	1% 38
2012	50% 1,882	48% 1,787	2% 44

== Arts and culture ==
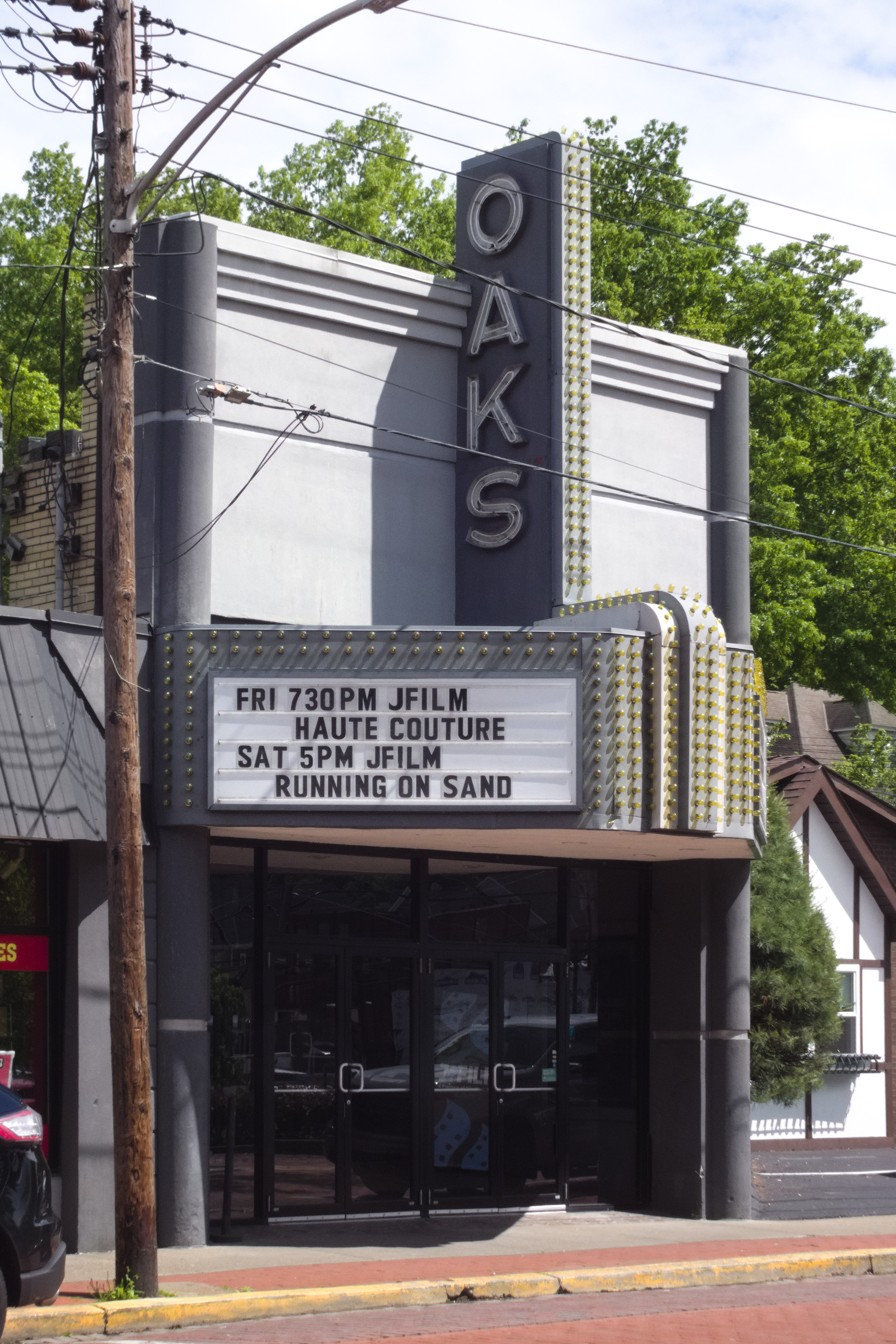
Oaks Theater

The Oakmont Country Club is partially located in Oakmont and predominantly in the neighboring borough of Plum. It has hosted a record ten U.S. Opens (1927, 1935, 1953, 1962, 1973, 1983, 1994, 2007, 2016, and 2025). The club has also held three PGA Championships, five U.S. Amateurs, three NCAA Division I men's golf championships and two U.S. Women's Opens.

The Kerr Memorial Museum was originally the home of the Kerr family, built in 1898. Today, it serves as a museum offering tours that explore the middle-class experience in late 19th-century America, providing a contrast to the era's extremes of wealth and poverty. The Oakmont History Center & Museum showcases the town's history. The Carnegie Library of Oakmont was established in 1899 as the tenth library funded by Andrew Carnegie in the U.S.

The Oaks Theater, opened on November 18, 1938, as "The Jewel of Oakmont," was one of the first theaters in the area to offer air conditioning. In 2015, it was transformed into a modern, multi-purpose venue while preserving its original Art Deco style. It now hosts live music, comedy, theater, and movies. Located on Pennsylvania Avenue, the Oakmont Verona Cemetery serves as a historic burial site for the community.

The Jonathon Hulton Bridge, built in 1908, connected Oakmont and Harmarville over the Allegheny River. It was demolished on January 26, 2016, to make way for a new bridge, which was completed in time for the 2016 U.S. Open. Riverside Park, along the Allegheny River, offers recreational amenities, including tennis courts, a basketball court, a running track, pavilions, and a children's playground.

== Education ==
Oakmont is served by the Riverview School District, which includes two elementary/junior high schools that extend through 6th grade and Riverview High School, which serves Oakmont and portions of neighboring Verona for grades 7–12.

== Notable people ==
- Paula Bauersmith, actress
- Reb Beach, American rock guitarist for Winger and Whitesnake
- Alfred McClung Lee, sociologist
- Emil Loeffler, professional golfer and golf course designer
- Charley Mehelich, American football player
- Edwin Foresman Schoch, United States Navy aeronautical engineer, combat pilot and test pilot
- Bob Shoop, American football coach

== See also ==
- List of crossings of the Allegheny River
- List of museums in Pennsylvania
