= Edwin Foresman Schoch =

American test pilot

Lieutenant Edwin Foresman Schoch
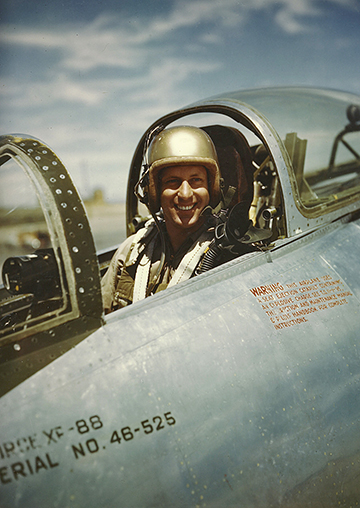
- Edwin Foresman Schoch in the XF-88 Voodoo at Edwards AFB
- Born: Edwin Foresman Schoch; September 13, 1916; Oakmont, Pennsylvania, U.S.
- Died: September 13, 1951 (aged 35); Elsberry, Missouri, U.S.
- Spouse: Arlene Whelply Schoch Judy (1920–2009)
- Children: 4
- Military career
- Allegiance: United States
- Branch: US Navy; United States Navy
- Service years: 1941–45 (4 years)
- Rank: Lieutenant
- Nickname: Ed
- Conflicts: World War II
- Awards: See below
- Other work: Test pilot

Edwin Foresman Schoch (September 13, 1916 – September 13, 1951) was a United States Navy aeronautical engineer, combat pilot and test pilot.

As a lieutenant in the Naval Reserve, he flew in combat against Japanese forces in the Pacific. After the war's end, he became one of the most renowned test pilots at McDonnell Aircraft Corporation and test-flew several experimental and early-model jet fighters including the XF-85 Goblin.

== Early years ==
Born in Oakmont, Pennsylvania, in 1916 to a family in the railroad industry that moved several times as he was growing up, Schoch graduated from South Park High School in Buffalo, New York. He worked for several years as a railroad clerk, saving money during the Great Depression so that he could attend college. He enrolled in Virginia Polytechnic Institute (VPI) in Blacksburg, Virginia, and graduated with a degree in mechanical engineering and a second lieutenant's commission in the United States Army.

Having learned to fly at VPI through the Reserve Officers' Training Corps (ROTC) program, he wanted to fly fighter aircraft. He thought his chances of being able to do so were better in the Navy than in the Army so, upon graduation in spring 1941, he resigned his Army commission, enrolled in the Navy Reserve as a seaman 2nd class and, having already learned to fly in VPI's ROTC program, was quickly accepted into the Navy’s flight training program.

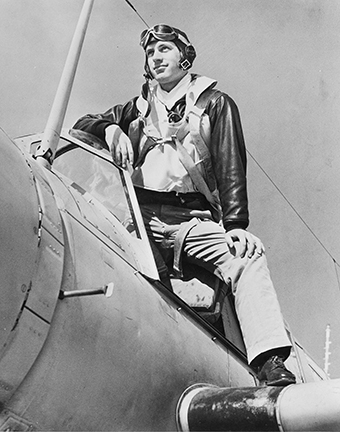
Ensign Ed Schoch in an OS2U Kingfisher during Navy flight training.

== World War II ==
Once he had earned his pilot's wings in the Navy, Schoch was assigned to Fighting Squadron 19, then being formed for anticipated combat against the Japanese in the Pacific as part of Air Group 19. With his engineering degree, Schoch was designated as the squadron engineering officer, and flew 46 combat missions with the squadron from the USS Lexington (CV-16) in summer and fall 1944.

Flying the Grumman F6F Hellcat, he shot down four Japanese aircraft during the squadron's combat tour, and hit a Japanese aircraft carrier with a bomb during the Battle of Leyte Gulf.

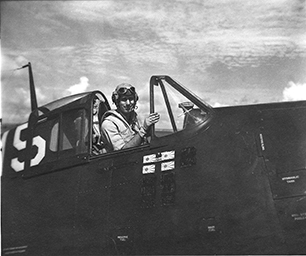
Lt. Schoch in the cockpit of an F6F-5 Hellcat aboard the USS Lexington, 1944

After his combat tour, in January 1945, Schoch was assigned to Fighter-Bomber Squadron 150, which was being formed in the United States in preparation for an invasion of Japan in 1945. He began training, once again as the engineering officer, in the new Vought F4U-4 at bases on the east coast of the US and aboard the newly commissioned USS Lake Champlain (CV-39). Japan’s surrender made both the invasion and Fighter-Bomber Squadron 150 unnecessary.

The war ended before either the squadron or the aircraft carrier saw combat duty, and Schoch left the Navy in November 1945.

== McDonnell career ==
Schoch was hired immediately after the war by McDonnell Aircraft Corporation as an aeronautical engineer and quickly moved up to a test pilot position as the company grew. He was the tenth pilot to fly the company’s FH-1 Phantom, the U.S. Navy’s first jet fighter to be carrier-qualified. He was the second pilot to fly the F2H Banshee, the Phantom's successor. The Phantom never saw combat service, but the Banshee was widely used during the Korean War (1950–1953) as a reconnaissance aircraft.

Schoch was the only pilot to fly the company’s XF-85 Goblin, at what is now Edwards Air Force Base. The Goblin was an experimental "parasite" fighter contemplated for use by the US Air Force in conjunction with the B-36 bomber. With the giant bomber still unavailable at the inception of the test program, for the test phase the special "trapeze" needed to launch and recover the small fighter was fitted on a Boeing EB-29.

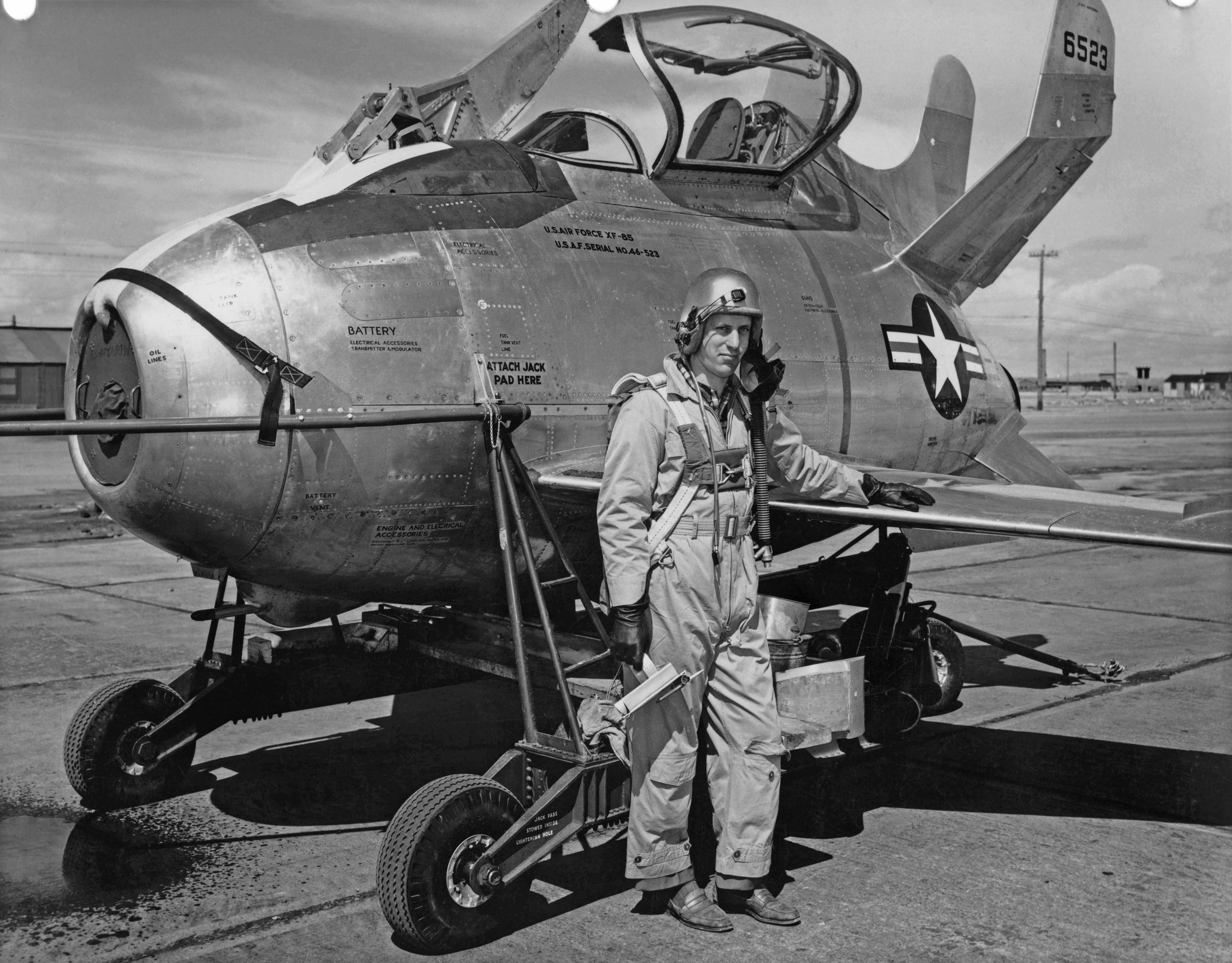
Schoch and the XF-85 Goblin at Muroc AFB

Flying the Goblin required skill, due to the difficulty of the hook-up manoeuvre and the lack of proper landing gear if hook-up was not completed. In seven free flights only the second, third and fourth resulted in successful hook-ups with the EB-29 mother ship, while the remaining four were concluded by belly-landings on the special landing skid of the parasite.

Schoch was also one of the lead pilots for McDonnell’s XF-88 program.

Both the XF-85 and the XF-88 programs were cancelled in the early 1950s, but the XF-88 showed enough promise to be revived a few years later and, with some modification, eventually became the F-101 Voodoo.

In between McDonnell’s experimental test programs at Edwards Air Force Base, Schoch flew numerous routine and maintenance test flights for aircraft already in production at the company's St. Louis facility.

Furthermore, while in service at the Naval Air Test Center in January 1948 he flew the North American FJ-1 Fury.

== Death and honors ==
While making a test flight over rural Missouri on his 35th birthday to investigate elevator-related issues, metal fatigue caused the tail section of the F2H-2 he was flying to fail, and then come apart in the air. He was killed in the ensuing crash.

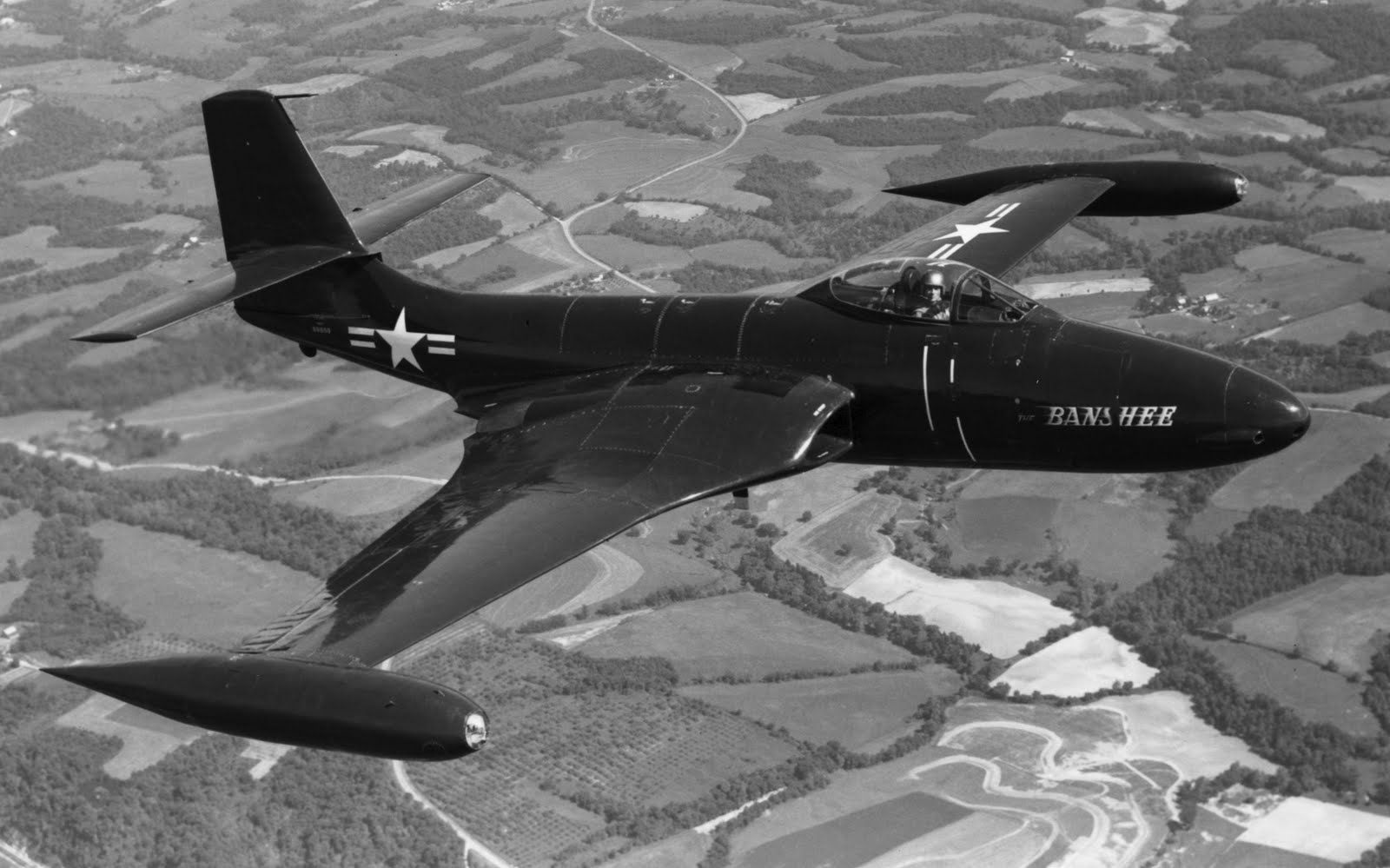
XFD-2 Banshee

The sequence of events is unclear, as the few witnesses were a mile or more away and there were no flight data recorders in use at that time. The crash site is about 60 miles (97 km) northwest of St. Louis.

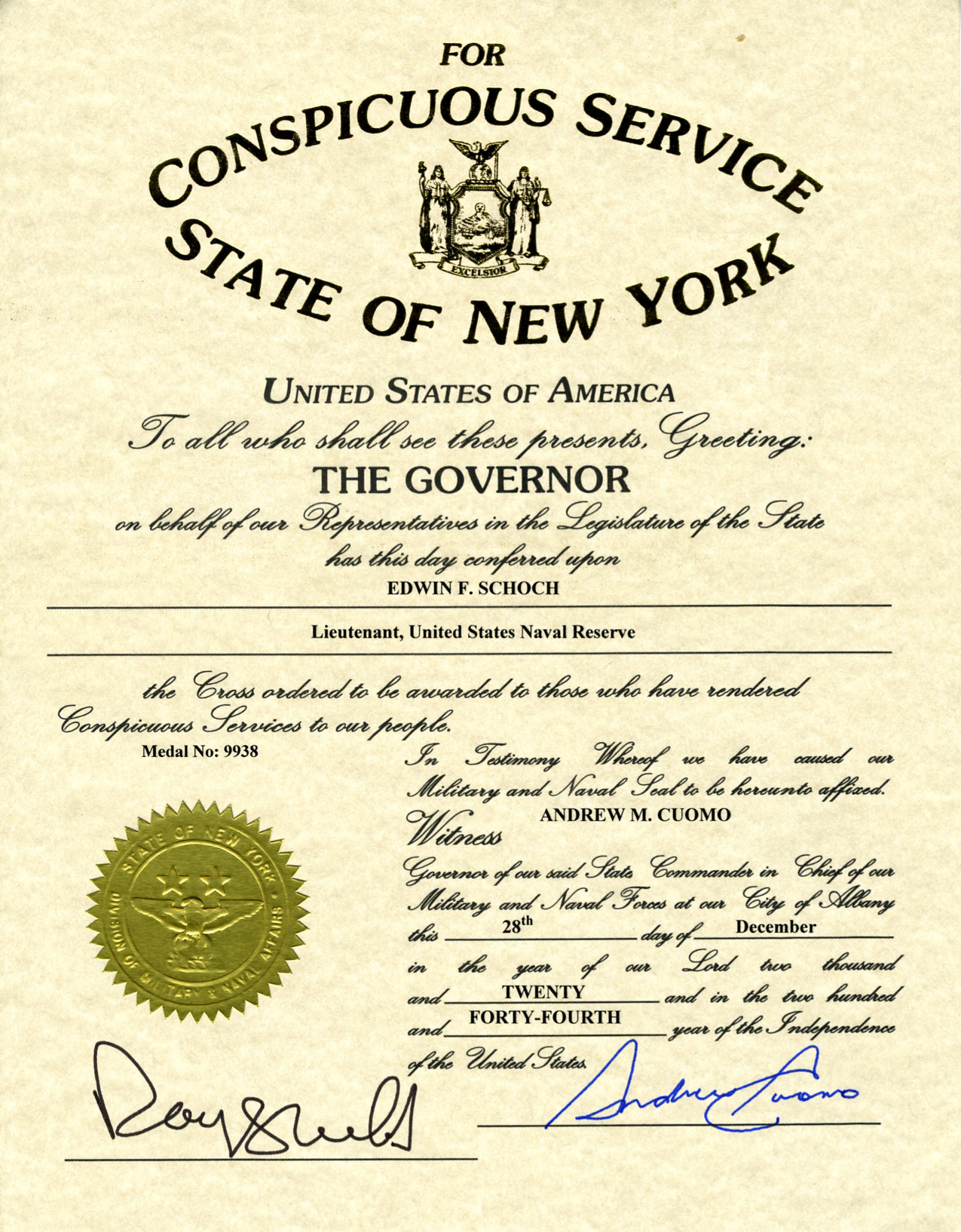
Accompanying Certificate of the New York State Conspicuous Service Cross awarded to Edwin Foresman Schoch on December 28, 2020

Air Medal – for his service during Fighting Squadron 19’s combat tour of duty, largely incorporating the Philippine campaign.
Distinguished Flying Cross – for shooting down three Japanese fighter planes in a single day, October 24, 1944, during the Battle of Leyte Gulf.
Navy Cross – for placing a semi-armor-piercing bomb aboard the Japanese light carrier Zuiho on October 25, 1944, helping to sink that ship during the Battle of Leyte Gulf.
Conspicuous Service Cross (New York) – awarded in December 2020 by the Governor of the State of New York for his service during World War II, upon initiative by South Park High School.
