= Jonathon Hulton Bridge =

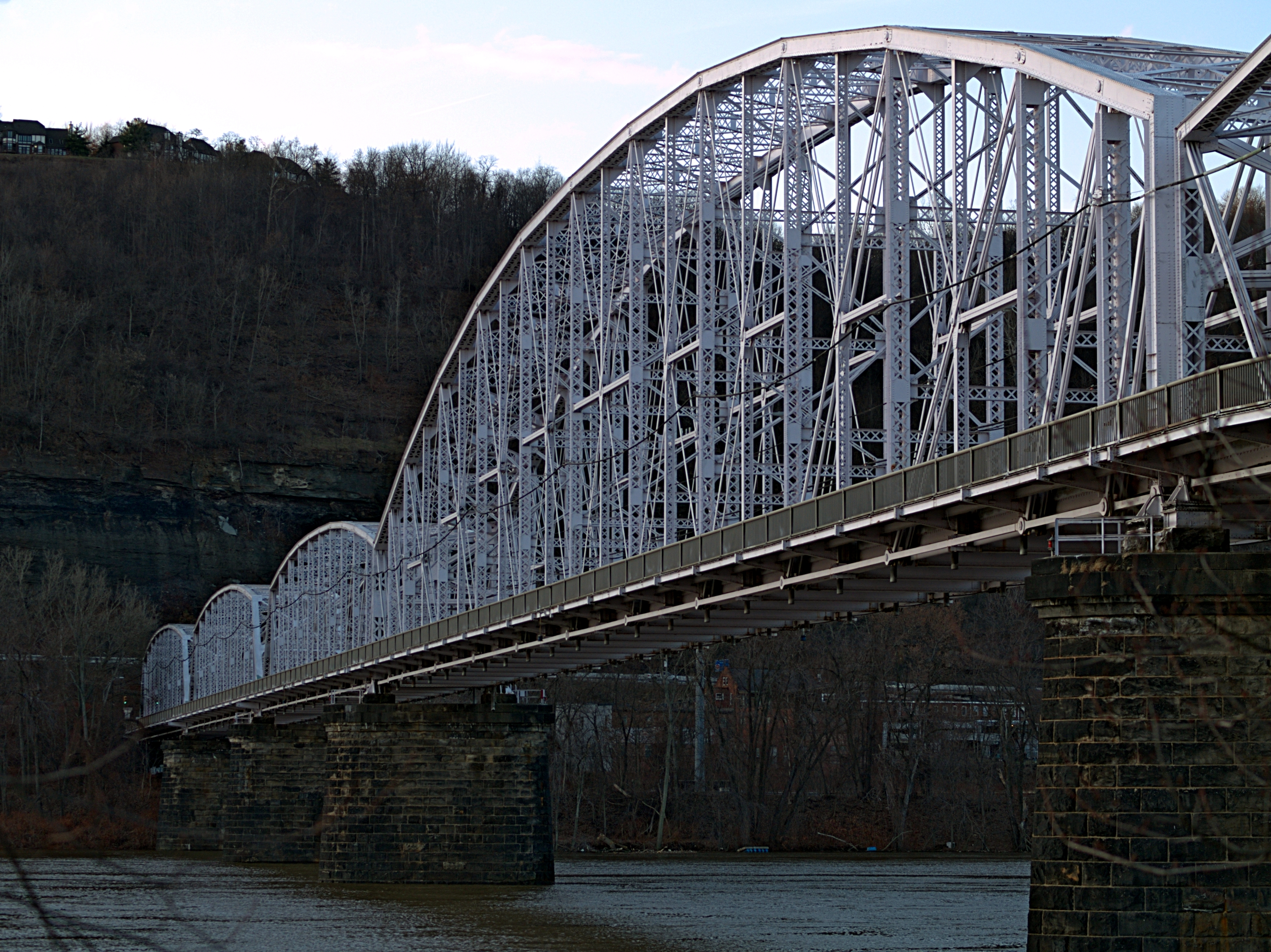
- Coordinates: 40.5283°N 79.8466°W
- Carries: 2 lanes of Allegheny County SR 2082
- Crosses: Allegheny River
- Locale: Oakmont, Pennsylvania
- Official name: Jonathon Hulton Bridge
- Other name: Hulton Bridge
- Maintained by: PennDOT

Characteristics
- Design: subdivided Parker Pratt through truss
- Material: Steel
- Total length: 470.6 metres (1,544 ft)
- Longest span: 140.2 metres (460 ft)
- No. of spans: 5
- Piers in water: 3
- Clearance below: 15.2 metres (50 ft)

History
- Opened: Spring of 1910
- Closed: October 5, 2015 (demolished January 26, 2016)

Statistics
- Daily traffic: 22,312

Location
- Interactive map of Jonathon Hulton Bridge

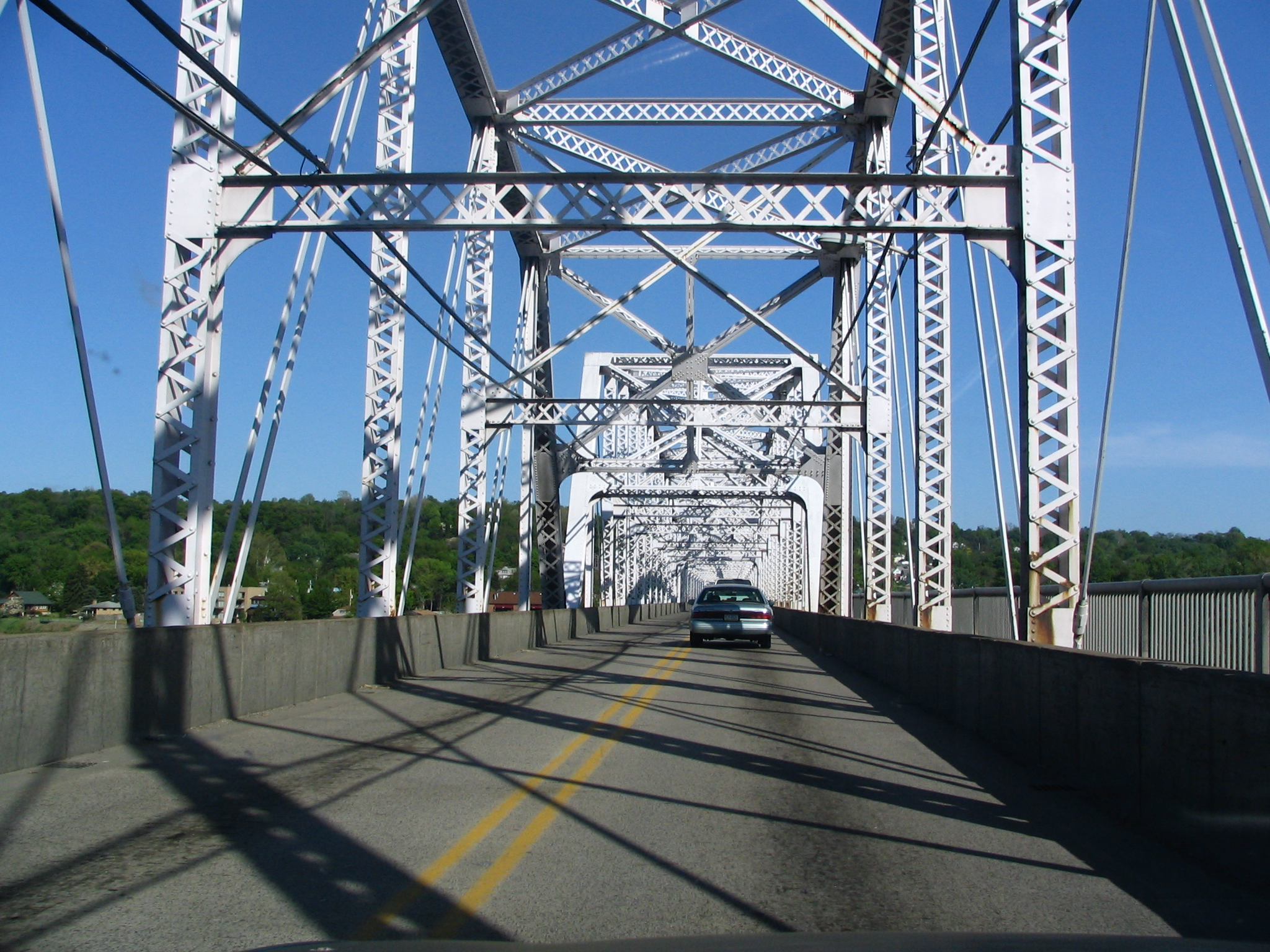
Jonathon Hulton Bridge from the road deck

The Jonathon Hulton Bridge, built in 1908, was the first major bridge designed by Allegheny County, Pennsylvania. Spanning the Allegheny River, it connected the eastern Pittsburgh suburbs of Oakmont and Harmarville, Pennsylvania.

== History ==
The bridge was a Parker Pratt through Truss bridge. These bridges were common in the early 20th century for car and rail traffic. The bridge was named for Jonathon Hulton, one of the first landowners in the Oakmont area. The Hulton family also operated a ferry across the Allegheny River near the current bridge location until its construction.

In 1989 the PA Legislature approved the renaming of the bridge in honor of the late Pennsylvania Representative Joseph F. Bonetto. Plaques were unceremoniously attached to the bridge, and three days later they were removed and never seen again. New larger plaques were put in their place confirming that it was indeed the Jonathon Hulton Bridge. Prior to its implosion, the Hulton Bridge was painted a lavender color, a byproduct of the 1991 refurbishment of the bridge.

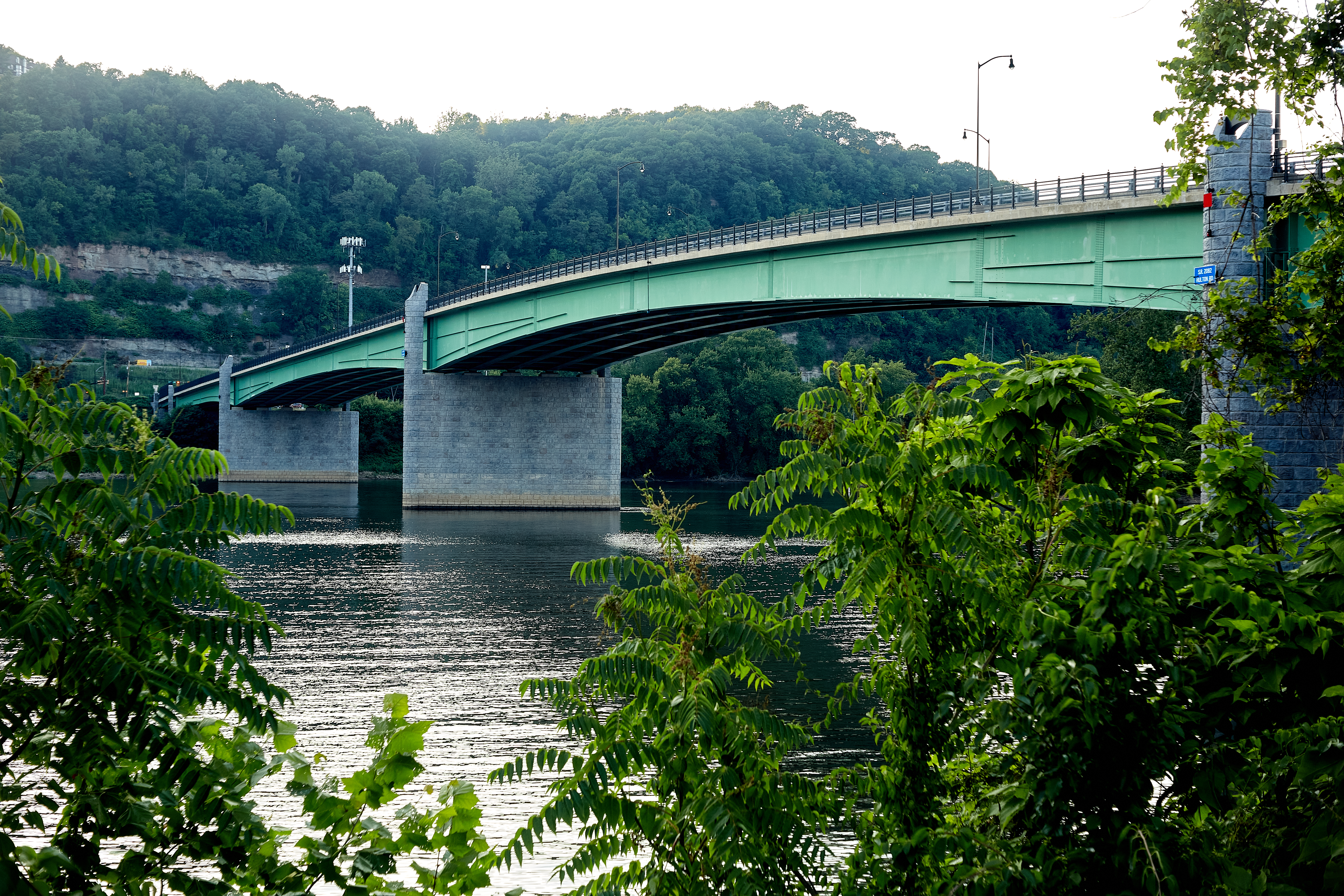
The new Hulton Bridge over the Allegheny River from the parking lot of Riverview High School

== Replacement project ==
Construction of a 1,600-foot (490 m)-long steel multi-girder replacement bridge just upstream of the original bridge began in September 2013. The new bridge, which opened to traffic on October 20, 2015, has four 11-foot (3.4 m)-wide traffic lanes (2 in each direction), one 4-foot (1.2 m)-wide median, one 4-foot (1.2 m)-wide shoulder on each side of the roadway, and a 5-foot (1.5 m)-wide ADA-compliant sidewalk on the bridge's southern side.

Aside from the new bridge itself, the scope of the $65 million replacement project also included realignment and reconstruction of parts of Freeport and Hulton roads, relocation of utilities, drainage, pavement markings, and improvements to intersections, lighting, traffic signals, curbs, and sidewalks. Six buildings on the Harmar side of the river were demolished to facilitate construction. The entire project, including implosion of the original bridge, was completed in spring 2016, in time for the 2016 U.S. Open at nearby Oakmont Country Club.

The replacement span was designed by Pennsylvania-based engineering firms Gannett Fleming and McCormick Taylor. Brayman Construction Corporation of Saxonburg, Pennsylvania was the general contractor for the project. Roughly 80% of the project's funding was provided by the federal government.

In 2009, when PennDOT announced the plan to replace and demolish the old bridge, engineering students from Carnegie Mellon University proposed to instead convert it into a pedestrian walkway and connect Oakmont to the Allegheny River Trail. However, it was determined that this conversion would be too costly, and that the old bridge would be demolished as originally planned.

The old bridge was imploded successfully at 9:50 a.m. on January 26, 2016. The implosion could be seen from the Harmar Bald Eagle Camera.

== See also ==
- List of crossings of the Allegheny River
