= Lehner Grain-and-Cider Mill and House =

- U.S. National Register of Historic Places
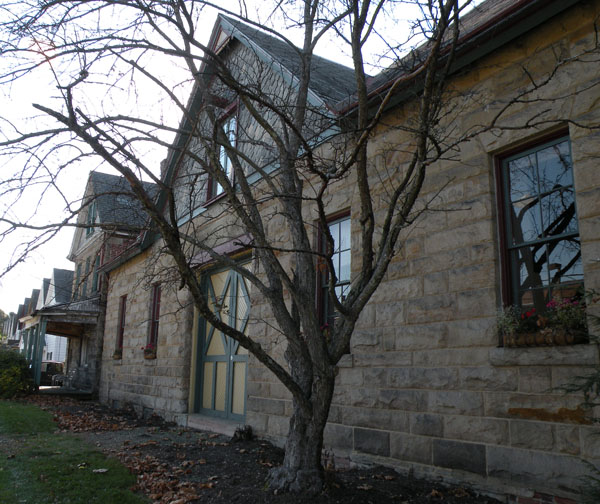

- Location within Pennsylvania Location within the United States
- Location: 548 and 560 Penn Street, Verona, Pennsylvania, USA
- Coordinates: 40°30′13.2″N 79°50′45.5″W
- Built: circa 1895
- NRHP reference No.: 96001202
- Added to NRHP: October 24, 1996

The Lehner Grain-and-Cider Mill and House is a historic American structure located at 548 and 560 Penn Street in Verona, Pennsylvania. Built circa 1895, It was added to the National Register of Historic Places on October 24, 1996.

== History and architectural features ==
Charles Lehner, who built the mill, and his wife, Mary Magdalene Huber, emigrated from Austria to Pittsburgh's North Side and later to Verona. The mill began operating in 1896. Lehner died in 1908 and the mill was run by his son Joseph until 1920 when he died, forcing his wife of three daughters to sell it.

Christine Davis Consultants, who work in archeological studies and historic preservation, bought the mill in the 1990s.

It was added to the National Register of Historic Places on October 24, 1996.
