= FICON project =

1950s USAF fighter conveyor program

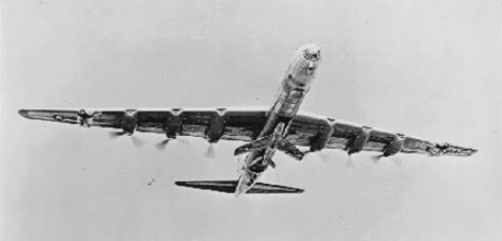
A Convair GRB-36 Peacemaker carrying a Republic YRF-84 Thunderjet

The FICON (Fighter Conveyor) program was conducted by the United States Air Force in the 1950s to test the feasibility of a Convair B-36 Peacemaker bomber carrying a Republic F-84 Thunderflash parasite fighter in its bomb bay. Earlier wingtip coupling experiments included Tip Tow, which were attempts at carrying fighters connected to the wingtips of bombers. Tom-Tom followed the FICON project afterwards.

== Background ==
=== Wingtip coupling experiments ===
Wingtip coupling experiments were evolved from the concept of adding extra floating panels to extend the effective wingspan of an aircraft, in the hope this would extend the range of the aircraft. This would theoretically act in the same manner as the long narrow wings of a glider. It is reported that the Germans experimented with the idea in 1944 and 1945 by coupling two equal-sized light planes together, then the idea was further developed by Richard Vogt, who came to the US from Germany after World War II. The idea was tested at Wright Field in the late 1940s using a Douglas C-47A Skytrain and Culver Q-14B Cadet. These tests showed the idea had promise, and Republic Aviation was awarded a contract to investigate further. Thus began the Tip Tow project.

=== Project MX-1016 (Tip Tow) ===
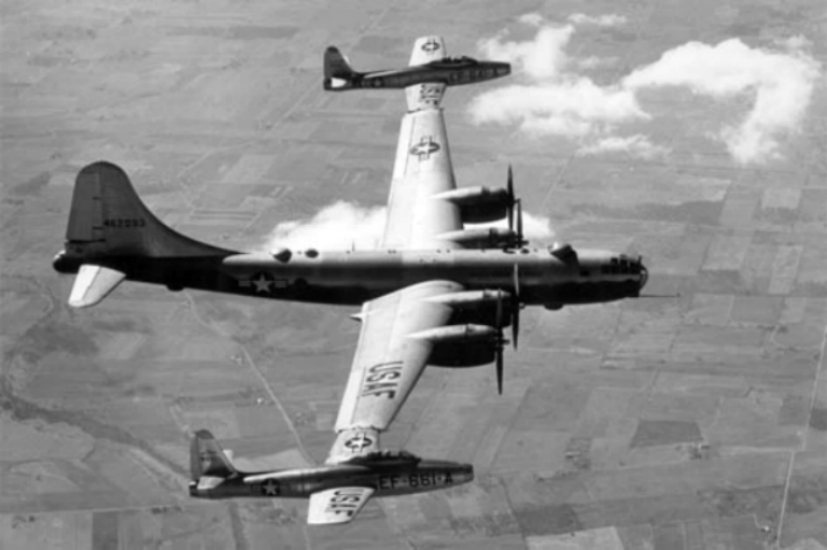
EB-29A docked wingtip-to-wingtip with two EF-84Ds in Project Tip-Tow

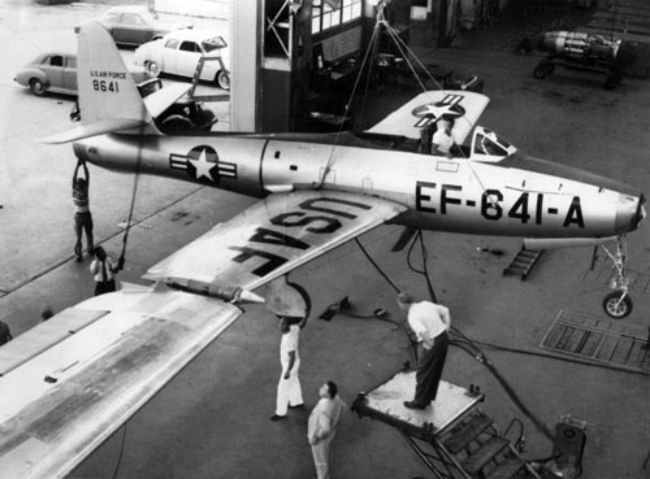
Close-up of the B-29 with EF-84D-1-RE 48-641 on wingtip hookup

The MX-1016 program (code named "Tip Tow") sought to extend the range of jets to give fighter protection to piston-engined bombers with the provision for in-flight attachment/detachment of the fighter to the bomber via wingtip connections. The Tip Tow aircraft consisted of a specially modified ETB-29A (serial number 44-62093) and two EF-84D (serial numbers 48-641 and 48-661). A number of flights were undertaken, with several successful cycles of attachment and detachment, using at first a single aircraft, then two. The pilots of the F-84s maintained manual control when attached, with roll axis maintained by elevator movement rather than aileron movement. Engines on the F-84s were shut down to save fuel during the "tow" by the mother ship, and in-flight engine restarts were successfully accomplished.

Wing flexibility of the B-29 as well as wing-tip vortices caused concern, and the mechanisms for attachment required modifications. The first hookup of both F-84s with the B-29 occurred on the 10th flight on 15 September 1950. The longest flight with all connected was on 20 October 1950, and lasted for 2 hours and 40 minutes. All of these flights were accomplished with manual control of the F-84 aircraft. Republic received an additional contract to continue the experiments by incorporating an automatic flight control system. Meanwhile, as the modifications proceeded, additional test flights were made, including night flights. The automatic flight control modifications were ready for testing in March 1953, and a number of hookups were made with only one or the other of the F-84s while attempting to sort continuing electrical issues. On 24 April 1953, over Peconic Bay, New York State, the left-hand F-84 hooked up and the automatic system was activated. The F-84 immediately flipped over onto the wing of the B-29 and both crashed with loss of all five crew and the F-84 pilot.

The pilot of the right-hand F-84D, Major Clarence E. "Bud" Anderson wrote of the Tip-Tow experiments in an article entitled Aircraft Wingtip Coupling Experiments published by the Society of Experimental Test Pilots.

=== Project Tom-Tom ===
In parallel, a similar configuration, called Tom-Tom, was being developed using JRB-36F 49-2707, which was previously used in the early FICON trials and two RF-84F (serial numbers 51-1848 and 51-1849). The aircraft were attached wingtip-to-wingtip using articulated arms and clamps. Although several successful hookups were performed by Convair pilots Doc Witchell, Beryl Erickson, and Raymond Fitzgerald in 1956, turbulence and vortices continued to present a major problem. On 23 September 1956, RF-84F 51-1849, piloted by Beryl Erickson, was actually torn away from the right wing tip of the JRB-36F. All aircraft landed safely but the concept was deemed too dangerous. Developments in the area of inflight refueling at the time promised a much safer way of extending the range of the fighters and Project Tom-Tom was canceled.

== FICON concept ==
Although the experimental McDonnell XF-85 Goblin escort fighter proved to be a failure, USAF believed that the bomber-borne fighter concept was still viable. Instead of escort, the focus had shifted to a strike role with a Convair B-36 Peacemaker carrying a Republic F-84 Thunderjet fighter. The plan was for the heavy bomber with superior range to arrive in the vicinity of the target and deploy a faster, more maneuverable F-84 to deliver the tactical nuclear bomb. The F-84 would then return to the "mothership" and be carried home.

== FICON testing ==
A production RB-36F-1-CF Peacemaker (serial number 49-2707) was modified with a special trapeze mechanism in its bomb bay and designated GRB-36F, and a production F-84E Thunderjet (serial number 49-2115) was fitted with a retractable hook in the nose in front of the cockpit. The hook would link the fighter to the trapeze which would hold the aircraft in the bomb bay during flight, lower it for deployment, and raise it back in after the mission. Due to the size of the fighter, only the cockpit, the fuselage spine, and the tailfin actually fit inside the GRB-36, which considerably increased the drag and reduced the big bomber's range by 5–10%. On a positive note, the fighter pilot was able to leave his aircraft while attached to the carrier, making the 10-hour flights to and from the target much more bearable.

The initial FICON trials were performed in 1952. First hookup took place on 9 January 1952, with first retrieval into the bomb bay on 23 April, and first flight of the complete system from takeoff to landing on 14 May. In 1953, the GRB-36/F-84E was sent to Eglin Air Force Base where 170 airborne launches and retrievals were subsequently performed. In May 1953, the F-84E was replaced by the faster Republic F-84F Thunderstreak, with the original YRF-84F (briefly called YF-96A) prototype (serial number 49-2430) modified for the role and briefly designated GRF-84F. When the RF-84F Thunderflash tactical reconnaissance fighter began entering service, the FICON role was changed from attack to reconnaissance. As with the F-84, the RF-84 was supposed to use its smaller size and superior agility to overfly heavily defended targets and gather intelligence while the bomber loitered outside the range of enemy defenses. The scheme was found to be "tactically sound" and USAF ordered 10 production RB-36D to be converted to GRB-36D carriers with a complement of 25 RF-84K tactical reconnaissance fighters. The RF-84K differed from RF-84F in having retractable hookup equipment and anhedral tailplanes to better fit inside the GRB-36. Since it retained an armament of four 0.50-inch (12.7 mm) machine guns, it could also act as an escort fighter. The RF-84K could be deployed at altitudes of up to 25,000 ft (7,600 m) and added 1,180 mi (1,900 km) to GRB-36D's 2,800 mi (4,500 km) combat range.

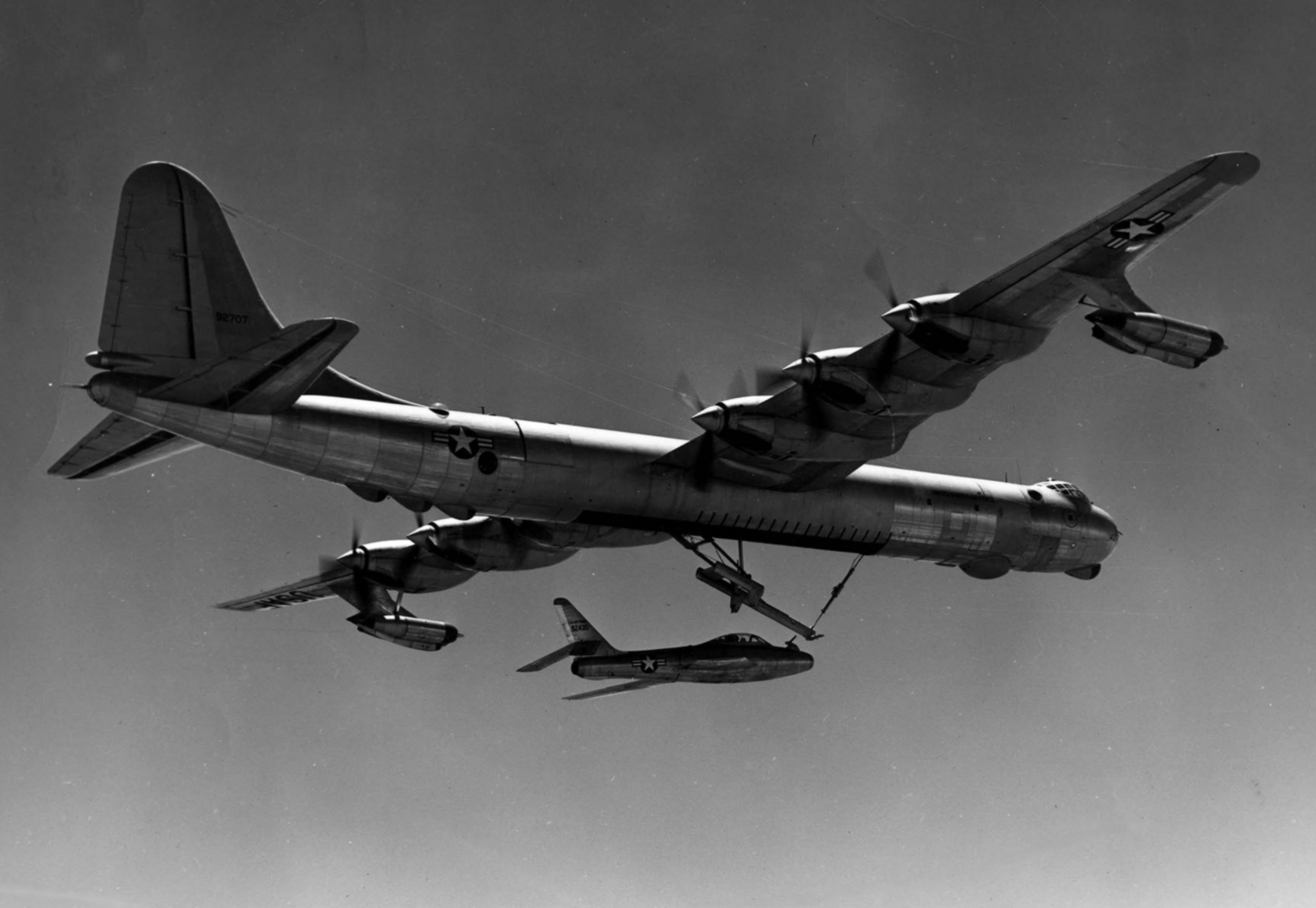
GRB-36 launching YRF-84F from the trapeze

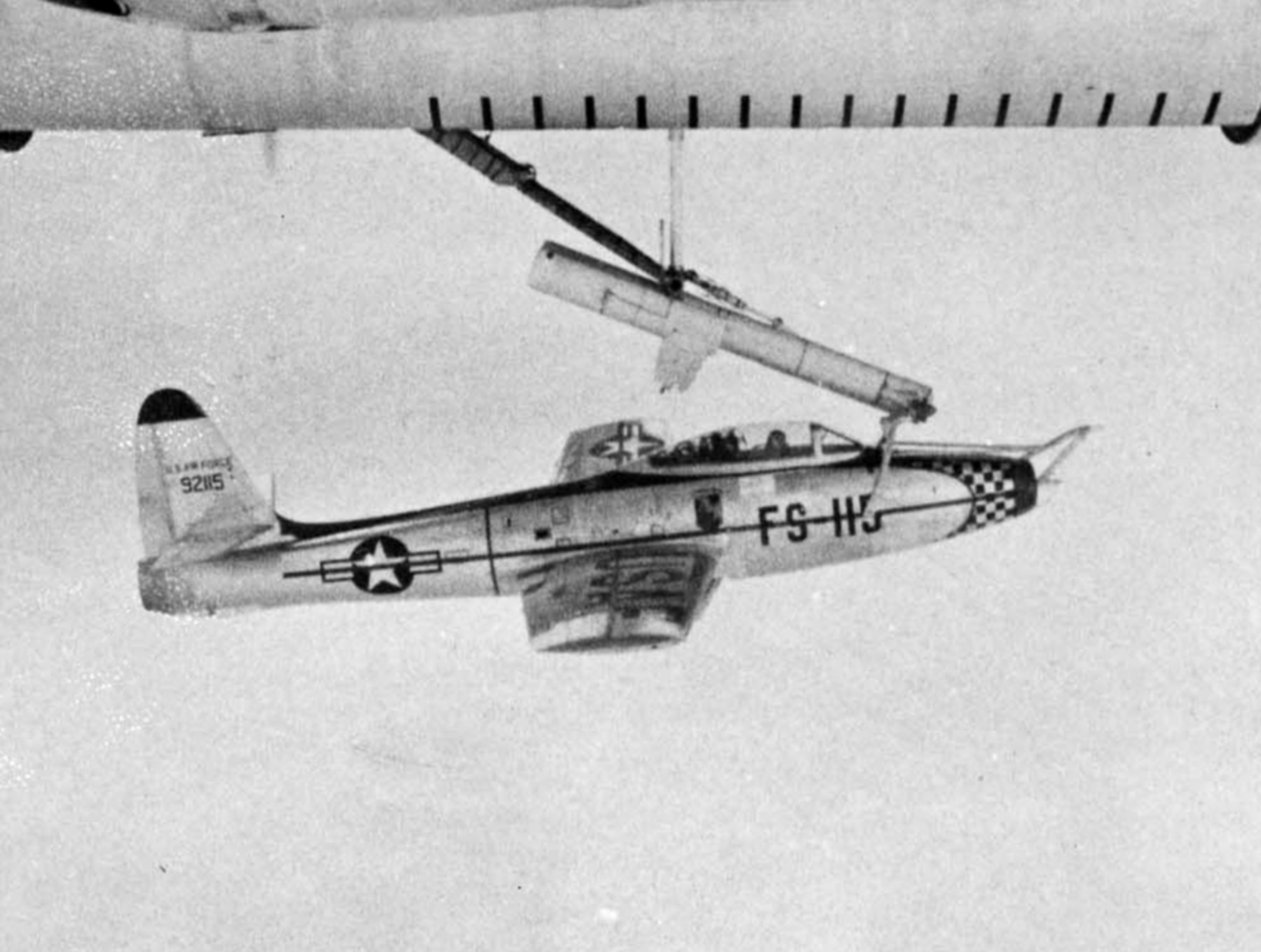
F-84E on FICON trapeze.

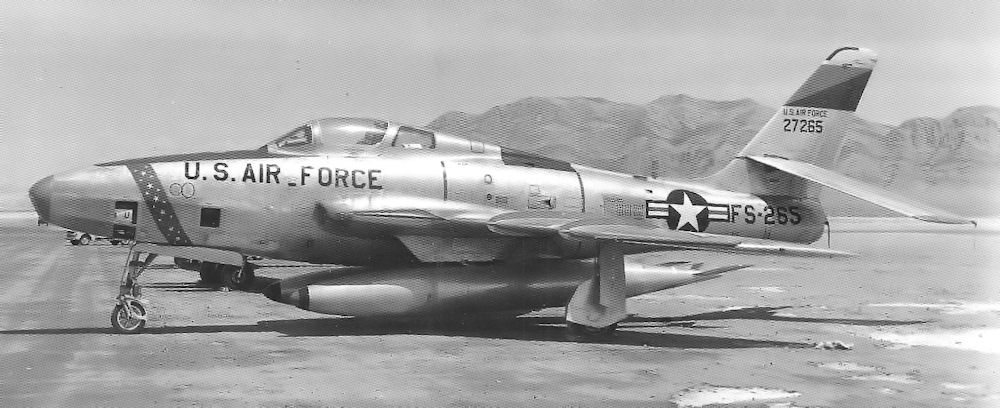
RF-84K Thunderflash of the 407th Strategic Fighter Wing, 1955

== FICON in service ==
The FICON system saw limited service with Strategic Air Command in 1955–56. The GRB-36D carriers from 99th Strategic Reconnaissance Wing (Fairchild AFB) operated in conjunction with RF-84K from 91st Strategic Reconnaissance Squadron (Larson AFB).

Subsequent test flights demonstrated the FICON concept was indeed "tactically sound", but its operational implementation was difficult. A total of 10 GRB-36Ds and 25 RF-84Ks were built and saw limited service in 1955–56. Hookups with the carrier aircraft were challenging for the experienced test pilots under ideal conditions. In combat or in adverse weather, and by less-experienced pilots, they proved difficult, and several RF-84Ks were damaged attempting it. In addition, the RF-84 dramatically reduced the bomber's ground clearance: with 450 U.S. gal (1,700 L) external tanks on the fighter, the FICON combination cleared by a mere 6 inches (15 cm). These adversities, combined with the advent of the Lockheed U-2 and the passing of the B-36 into obsolescence, resulted in cancellation of the project in 1956, with the last FICON flight taking place on 27 April.

Upon cancellation, some RF-84Ks were scrapped, but others operated as reconnaissance aircraft with retractable hook apparatus still in place. Only three survive; one at the National Museum of the United States Air Force, one at Planes of Fame "static lot" in Chino, California, and one at the Wings Over the Rockies Air and Space Museum in Denver, Colorado.

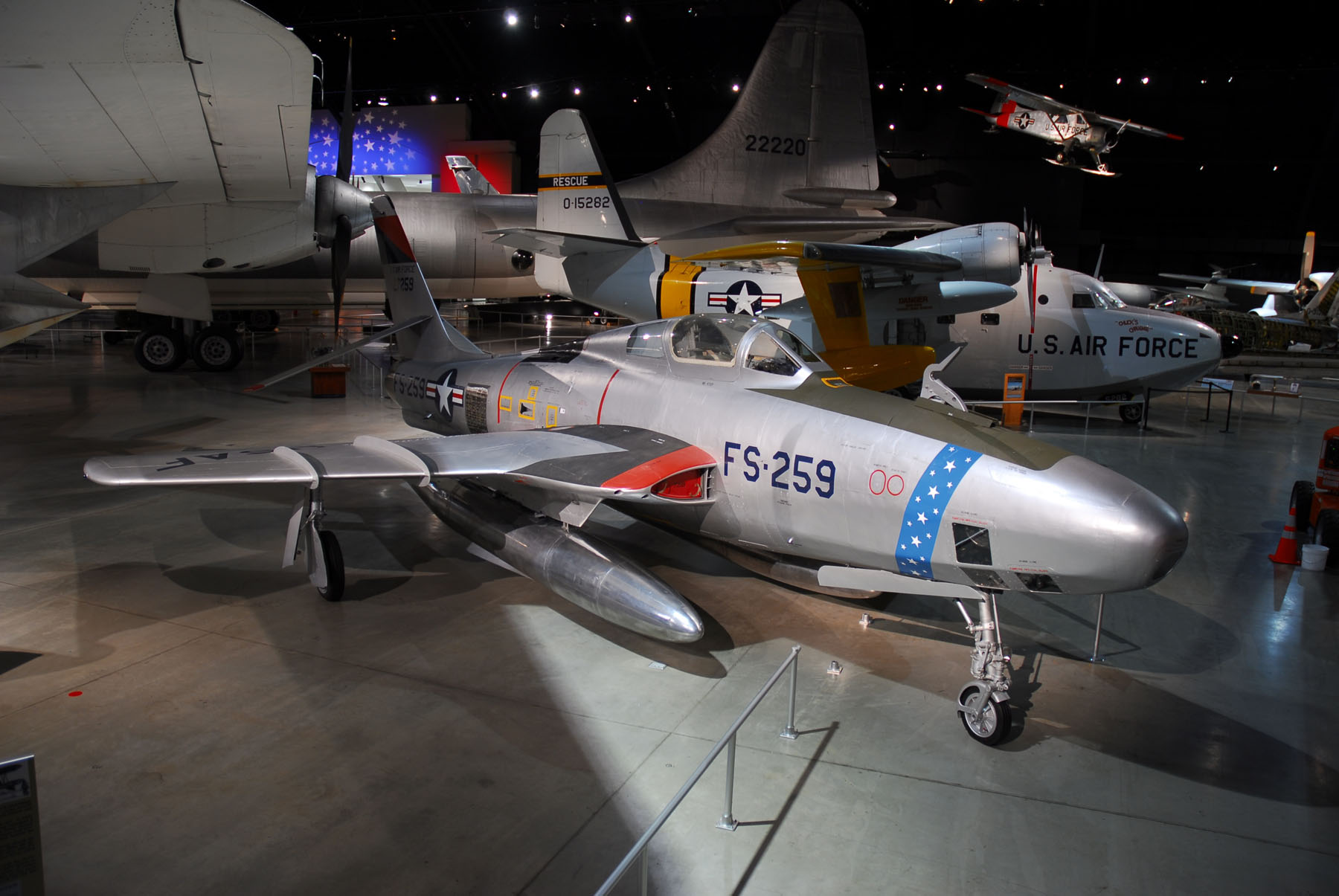
Republic RF-84K Thunderflash at the National Museum of the United States Air Force
