= Little Hug =

Brand of drink

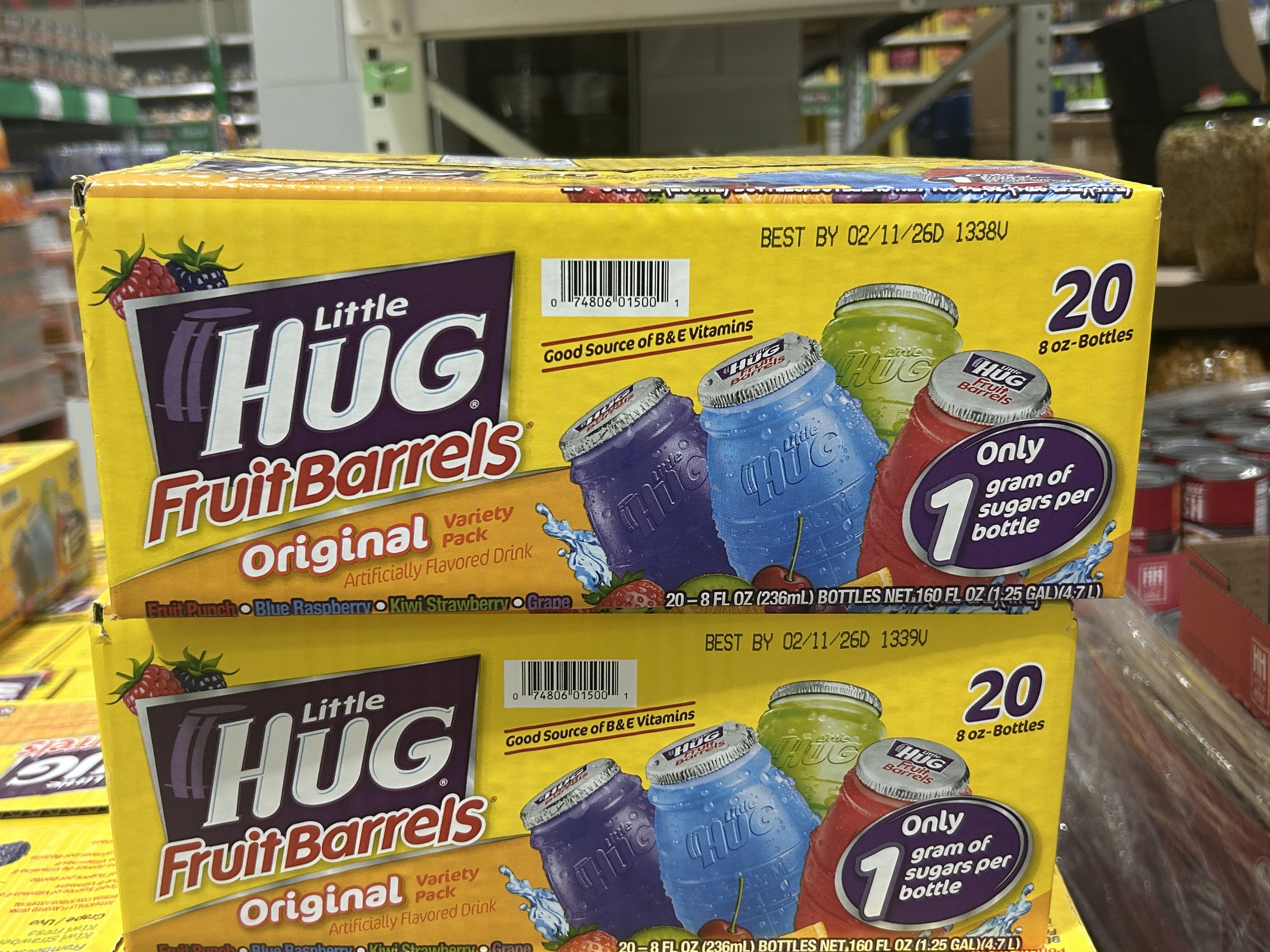
- Little Hug Box at a Menards store
- Founded: 1974
- Headquarters: America
- Products: Fruit drinks
- Website: littlehug.com

Little Hug Fruit Barrels is a brand of fruit-flavored drink introduced in 1974 in the form of plastic 8-ounce (236mL) barrel-shaped bottles (marketed as Little Hug) and 16-ounce (470 mL) bottles (marketed as Big Hug).

Little Hugs are often colloquially referred to as quarter waters.

== History ==
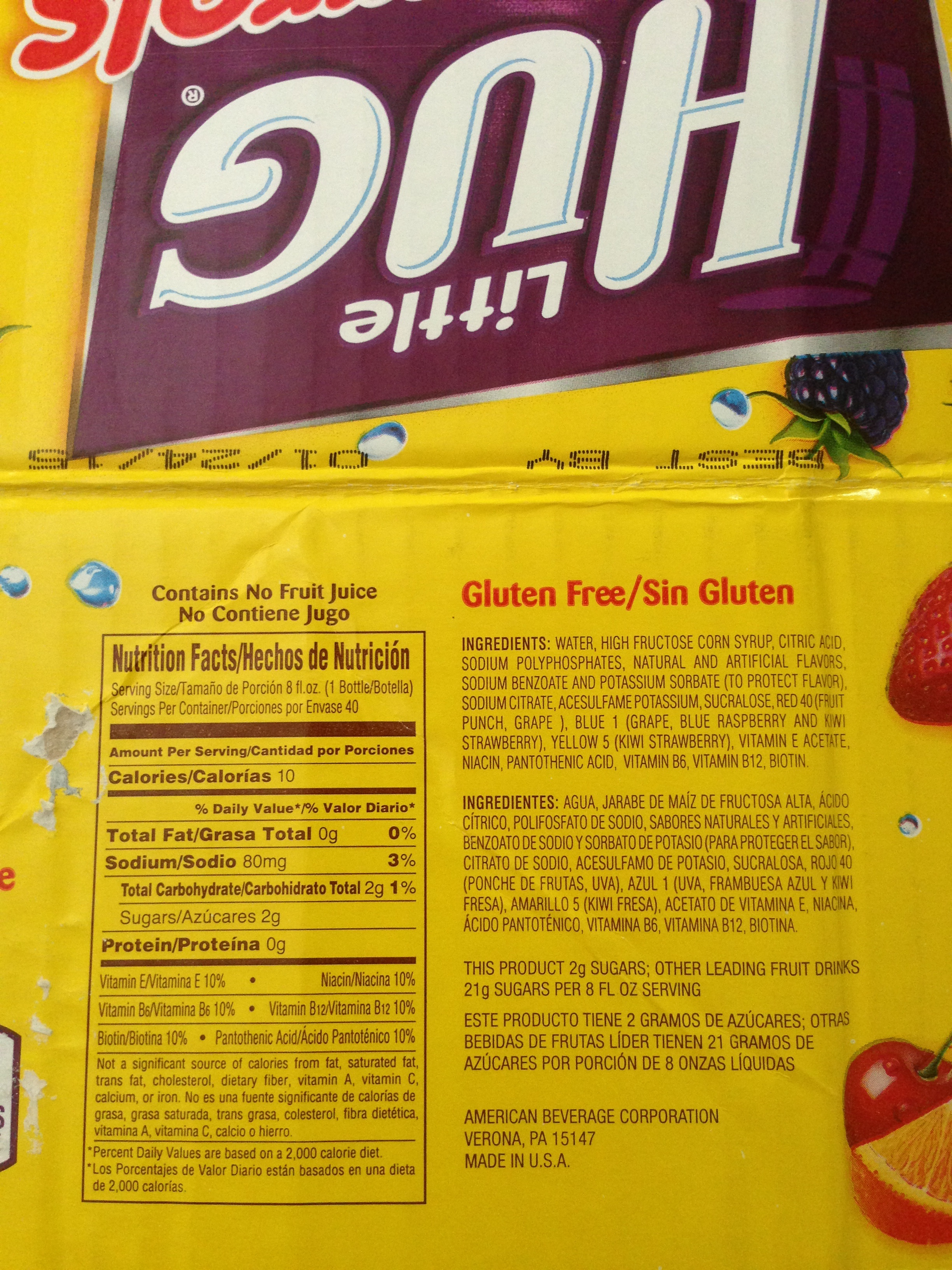
Nutrition facts on a Little Hug package

Little Hug Fruit Barrels were introduced in 1974 by the American Beverage Corporation.

In March 2015, Royal Wessanen sold the American Beverage Corporation to Harvest Hill Beverage, owner of Juicy Juice for $55 million

== Products ==
=== Little Hug Fruit Barrels ===
8-ounce (236mL) flavored drinks in a barrel-shaped plastic bottle with a foil lid.

==== Original Variety Pack ====
Sold in packages in various sizes and containing fruit punch, blue raspberry, grape, and kiwi-strawberry flavored drinks.

==== Berry Blends Variety Pack ====
They were released in 2013 and are sold in packages containing wild berry, cherry berry, blue raspberry, and lemon berry flavored drinks.

==== Tropical Variety Pack ====
Sold in packages containing orange, fruit punch, lemonade, and tropical punch flavored drinks.

==== Lemonade Stand ====
Sold in packages containing lemonade, strawberry lemonade, pink lemonade, and raspberry lemonade flavored drinks.

==== Little Hug 6-packs ====
They are available at dollar stores in fruit punch, blue raspberry, and lemonade flavors.

=== Big Hug ===
16 ounce (470mL) flavored drinks in a plastic barrel-shaped bottle with a resealable lid. They are sold individually in orange, kiwi-strawberry, grape, blue raspberry, fruit punch, citrus, and lemonade flavors

=== Little Hug Fruit Slushee ===
They are drinks sold in plastic pouches meant to be frozen that were released in 2015 in the flavors strawberry, blue raspberry, and lemonade.

== Endorsements ==
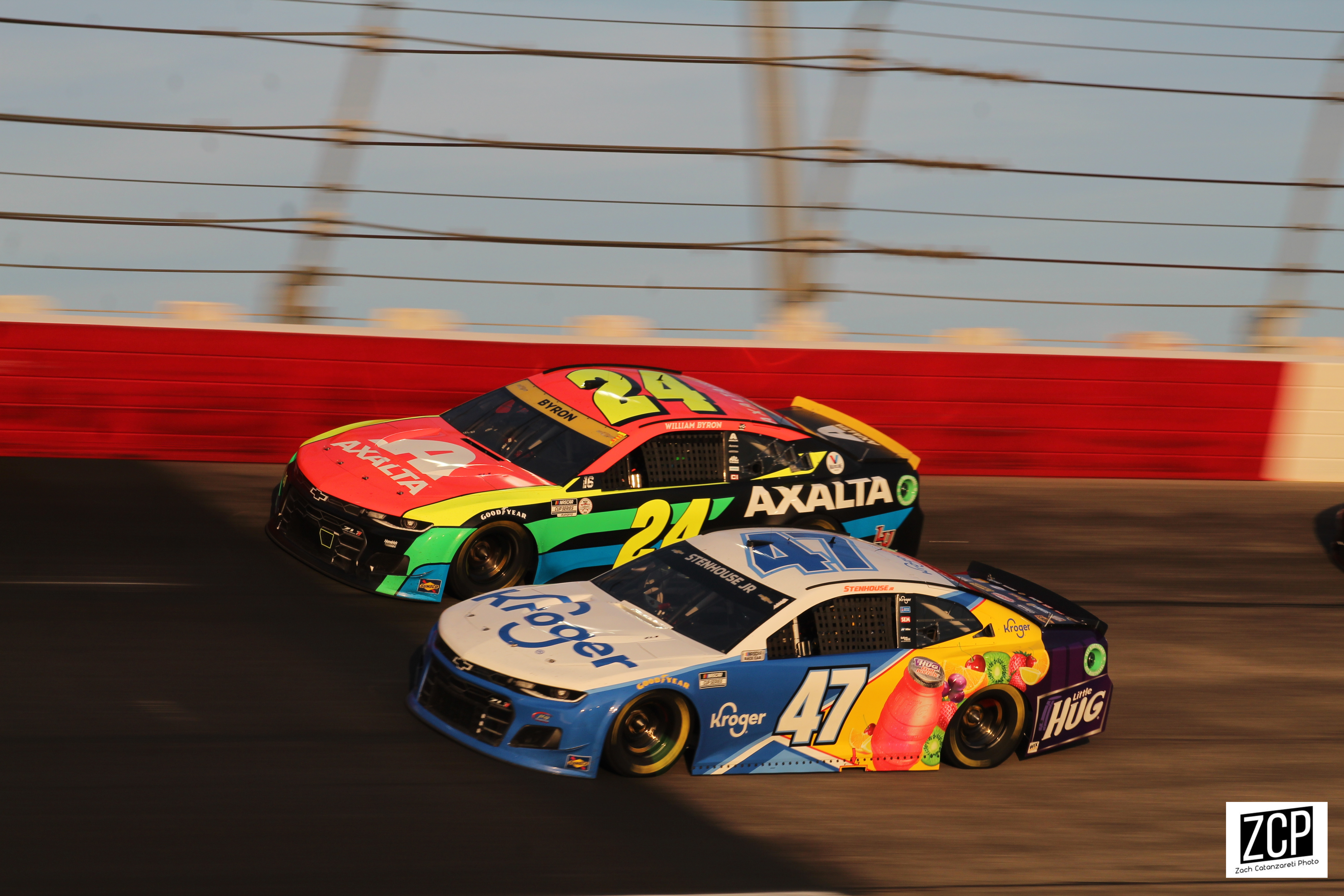
Stenhouse Jr. racing against William Byron at Darlington Raceway

Little Hug had an endorsement with NASCAR driver Ricky Stenhouse Jr. for two races in June of 2017

They currently sponsor the No. 20 Joe Gibbs Racing Toyota GR Supra for Brandon Jones.
