= Eric Thorsen =

American painter and sculptor (born 1967)

- A sculpture by Thorsen depicting a beleaguered American World War I soldier holding his M1903 Springfield rifle. A captured German stahlhelm sits nearby.
- Born: October 6, 1967 (age 59); Glasgow, Montana
- Known for: Sculpture
- Notable work: "Mystery of the Redd"
- Awards: Carl E. Akeley Award, Best In World winner 1992 World Taxidermy & Fish Carving Championships; Award of Excellence 2000, Society of Animal Artists; Ralph "Tuffy" Berg Award, C. M. Russell Show 1996; People's Choice Award Best Sculpture 2000–2003 C. M. Russell Shows
- Patrons: Nike Corporation; Washington Park Zoo; Norwalk City Center; Cameron Park and Zoological and Botanical Sciences; Lowes Hardware; John D. MacArthur State Park

Eric Thorsen (born October 6, 1967) is an American painter and sculptor known for his wildlife sculpture and fish carvings which have won him multiple awards at major art shows nationwide including "Best In World" at the 1992 World Taxidermy & Fish Carving Championships. At age 24 he is the youngest recipient of this award. Breakthrough magazine described him as "More than Promising" and his work has "an uncanny realism". Thorsen has appeared on TV shows and YouTube and his artwork can be found in prominent public spaces, private collections, and on product labels. He has been commissioned to create artwork for corporate entities such as Nike Inc.,Lowe's, Coca-Cola, Walt Disney Attractions, Inc. and national non profit groups. He is a resident of Bigfork, Montana.

== Early life ==
Thorsen was born on October 6, 1967, in Glasgow, Montana. He is the son of Marcus Walter Thorsen and Denise Renee Meunier. His father, while in active service in the U.S. Air Force, met Denise Meunier in Le Mans, France. They soon married and moved to Glasgow, Montana, in 1965. Eric was born on the Glasgow, Montana, air force base. Later the family would move to St. Charles, Illinois. Thorsen would spend summers growing up with his mother's family in France visiting the Louvre, Musee D'Orsay, Musee du Rodin and Picasso's museum in Paris. He studied works of Rodin, Picasso, Matisse and many other painters and sculptors.

Active in boy scouts, Thorsen earned the Eagle Scout rank. He graduated high school at age 17 in 1985 from St. Charles High School located in St. Charles, Illinois. Following his graduation from St. Charles High School, Thorsen moved back to his home state of Montana and attended the University of Montana where he studied for several years but did not graduate. Thorsen carved wood sculptures in his college dorm room and his first exhibition was in the Ghost Art Gallery in Butte, Montana, in 1988. Thorsen exhibited his works of art while in college and left his studies to pursue creating artwork as a full-time career.

In 1990, Thorsen was contracted to create sculptures to be reproduced by Tom Taber Co. to be used as fundraising items for Ducks Unlimited. Soon after, in 1991, Eric created sculptures for the Meissenburg Design Company commissioned by companies such as Coca-Cola, Walt Disney Attractions, Inc. and non-profit groups.

In 1995, Thorsen started creating sculptures for Big Sky Carvers with thousands of pieces being sold and millions of dollars being generated for non-profit groups nationwide, including Ducks Unlimited.

In 1993, he opened a gallery and studio in Bigfork, Montana.

== Personal life ==
Thorsen met his future wife, Cyndy Askeland, at the University of Montana in 1987. Askeland majored in education and graduated in 1991 with a degree in education. They were married on August 17, 1991, and two children were born to the couple, daughters Gabrielle and Madelaine.

== Works ==
Eric Thorsen is known for his hyper-realistic style in woodcarving. Early in his career he was drawn to the hyper-realism style being explored by other wood sculptors such as Franz Dutzler and Jett Brunett. In 1992 he entered his woodcarving titled "Mystery of the Redd" into the World Taxidermy & Fish Carving Championships and won the "Best in World" award and title for 1992–1995. At age 23 he is the youngest recipient of this award. Breakthrough magazine wrote about his "Best in World" award-winning sculpture at the World Taxidermy & Fish Carving Championships. "The bright hues of the three fish, the details of the scales and the flex of each fin have an uncanny realism. It's as if the fish were frozen in action for the person to touch".

In 1995, Thorsen began sculpting in clay creating both stylized and lifelike sculptures of both figurative and animal subjects. and casting his sculptures in bronze. Examples of work created include "The Coop", a bronze sculpture depicting Cynthia Cooper for the Nike Campus in Beaverton, Oregon. and "Children & Doves", City Civic Center, City of Norwalk, California. Thorsen sculpted a life-size bald eagle bust in under 30 minutes for the C. M. Russell Museum Quickdraw event in 1996.

A bronze sculpture by Thorsen, valued at $18,500, was stolen from Norwalk Civic Center in 2015. The bronze, which the thieves had taken to a metal recycler, was later recovered.

== Philanthropy ==
Thorsen volunteers at local schools teaching CAD Software and 3D printing technology in the classroom. His sculptures have raised funds for non-profit organizations throughout the US and Canada through the following organizations: National Ducks Unlimited; National Elk Foundation; and the National Wild Turkey Federation. Thorsen has also raised funds for a dozen or more other organizations, the list of which is too numerous to mention here.

== Public collections ==
- Tretyakov Gallery, Moscow, Russia
- Natural History Museum, London, England
- Auburn University
- The University of Tampa
- University of Arizona
- Monterey Bay Aquarium. CA
- Washington Park Zoo, Michigan City, IN
- Cameron Park and Zoological and Botanical Sciences. Waco, TX
- Mankato Art Walk, Mankato, MN
- Norwalk City Center, paper boy, Norwalk, CA
- Nike Campus, WNBA player Cynthia Cooper #14 of Houston Comets, life-size bronze sculpture Nike Corporation, Beaverton, OR
- Norwalk City Center, Children and Doves (33' x 108” x 8”) City Civic Center, Norwalk, CA
- John D. MacArthur Beach State Park, North Miami Beach, FL
- Boca Grande Community Center, Boca Grande, FL
- Lowes Hardware, La Quinta, CA
- Lowes Hardware, Norwalk, CA
- Great Northern Town Center, Helena, MT
- Public Library, Polson, MT
- Benefis Healthcare Foundation, Great Falls, MT
- Lewis and Clark Bicentennial Trail, Helena, MT
- Moonlight Basin Lodge, Big Sky, MT
- Shaw Communications, Canada
- The Lodge at Whitefish Lake, Whitefish, MT
- Flathead Bank, Bigfork, MT

== Exhibitions ==
Thorsen's artwork has been displayed in a number of special museum exhibits and gallery shows including:

- 2019 South Dakota Sculpture Trail, Waterton, SD
- 2019 Sculptures on Parade, Mason City, IA
- 2018 Mankato, MN City Art Walking Sculpture Tour
- 2018 Sculpture Tour Eau Claire, Eau Claire, WI
- 2017 Sioux Falls Sculpture Walk, Sioux Falls, SD
- 2016 Mount St. Mary Park in St. Charles, IL
- 2014 Mankato, MN Art Walk
- 2014 Art Walk; Sioux Falls, SD People's Choice Award
- 2014 Washington Pavilion, Sioux Falls, SD
- Whitefish Gallery, Whitefish, MT
- 2013 Old Faithful Lodge. One man show; Yellowstone National Park, WY,
- 2013 Washington Pavilion, Sioux Falls, SD
- 2012 Art Walk; Sioux Falls, SD
- 2001 Nike Center, Lance Armstrong building. NIKE campus. Bearverton, OR
- 2000 S.A.A. Annual Exhibition, MacArthur Beach State Park, North Palm Beach, FL
- 2000 Academy Art Museum, Easton, MD
- 2000 Burpee Museum of Natural History, Rockford, IL
- 2000 University of Nebraska State Museum, Lincoln, NE
- 2000 Corpus Christi Museum of Science and History; South Texas Institute for the Arts, Corpus Christi, TX
- 2000 S.A.A. Annual Exhibition, MacArthur Beach State Park, North Palm Beach, FL
- 1999 S.A.A. Annual Exhibition, MacArthur Beach State Park, North Palm Beach, FL
- 1999 Burpee Museum of Natural History, Rockford, IL
- 1999 Utah Museum of Natural History, Salt Lake City, UT
- 1999 The Neville Public Museum, Green Bay, WI
- 1999 The R. W. Norton Art Gallery, Shreveport, LA
- 1998 S.A.A. Annual Exhibition, MacArthur Beach State Park, North Palm Beach, FL
- 1998 Disney's Animal Kingdom Walt Disney World, Orlando, FL
- 1998 Quick Draw, C. M. Russell Show, Great Falls, MT
- 1998-2009 Glacier International Airport, Kalispell, MT
- 1997 S.A.A. Annual Exhibition, MacArthur Beach State Park, North Palm Beach, FL
- 1997 C. M. Russell Show, Great Falls, MT
- 1997 C. M. Russell Museum Exhibit
- 1997 C. M. Russell Museum Exhibit "Fin land"
- 1996 S.A.A. Annual Exhibition, MacArthur Beach State Park, North Palm Beach, FL
- 1996 The Montana Governor's Mansion
- 1996 The Witte Museum, San Antonio, TX
- 1996 The Carnegie Museum of Natural History, Pittsburgh, PA
- 1996 The Neville Public Museum, Green Bay, WI
- 1996 The R. W. Norton Art Gallery, Shreveport, LA
- 1996 The Delaware Museum of Natural History, Wilmington, DE
- 1996 C. M. Russell Show, Great Falls, MT
- 1996 Quick Draw, C. M. Russell Show, Great Falls, MT
- 1996 S.A.A. Annual Exhibition, MacArthur Beach State Park, North Palm Beach, FL
- 1996 Art and Animals Exhibition, Bigfork, MT
- 1995 S.A.A. Annual Exhibition, MacArthur Beach State Park, North Palm Beach, FL
- 1995 Old Algonquin Museum, Algonquin, Ontario, Canada
- 1995 Virginia Museum of Natural History, Martinsville, VA
- 1995 Arts and Science Center for Southeast Arkansas, Pine Bluff, AR
- 1995 The Sangre de Christo Arts and Conference Center, Pueblo, CO
- 1995 S.A.A. Annual Exhibition, MacArthur Beach State Park, North Palm Beach, FL
- 1993 Boca Grande Civic Center
- 1992 World Fish Carving Championships. Gainesville, GA
- 1989 Hockaday Museum, Kalispell, MT

== Awards ==
- 2017 Best of Show II winner at the annual Sioux Falls, South Dakota Sculpture Walk
- 2014 People's Choice Award, Mankato, MN Art Walk
- 2014 Art Walk; Sioux Falls, SD People's Choice Award
- 2012 "Best of Show" Art Walk; Sioux Falls, SD
- 2003 People's Choice, Best Sculpture, C. M. Russell Show, C. M. Russell Museum Complex
- 2002 People's Choice, Best Sculpture, C. M. Russell Show, C. M. Russell Museum Complex.
- 2001 People's Choice, Best Sculpture, C. M. Russell Show, C. M. Russell Museum Complex
- 2000 People's Choice, Best Sculpture, C. M. Russell Show, C. M. Russell Museum Complex
- 2000 Award of Excellence, Society of Animal Artists
- 1998 C. M. Russell Quick Draw Highest Bid
- 1996 Ralph "Tuffy" Berg Award, C. M. Russell Show C. M. Russell Museum Complex
- Best of Show, Premium Show of Fine Art
- 1992 Carl E. Akeley Award, Best In World winner, World Taxidermy & Fish Carving Championships
- 1992 World Fish Carving Championships, First Place, Master Division, World Class

== Television appearances ==
- KPAX-TV special 1994 Under the Big Sky
- Bigfork History Project
- Interview Montana
- 2001 ESPN Interview, Eric Thorsen – Cynthia Cooper dedication
- KDLT-TV, Sioux Falls, SD

=== Television & movies ===
Thorsen's art has been used in television and movies: WKRP in Cincinnati; Wild Things (1998), directed by John McNaughton; City Confidential; C Span with Anderson Cooper, opening sequence.
