= Weed Lake =

Wetland in Alberta, Canada

Coordinates: 50°58′47″N 113°39′21″W

Weed Lake is a wetland near Langdon, Alberta, Canada. It is the home to many natural wildlife including several species of birds and fish.

Weed Lake is located about 20 km (12 miles) east of Calgary, immediately north-east of Langdon. It is a 600 ha (1,500 acres) wetland that is regionally important as waterfowl habitat. In 1971, the original lake was drained for agriculture but since 2006, the lake has been restored and it is now a fully functioning, healthy wetland ecosystem. Organizations involved in acquiring the land and restoring the lake were led by Ducks Unlimited and include the Calgary Field Naturalists' Society.

== List of species ==
In 2015 students of Sarah Thompson School, assisted by local wildlife experts, identified the following list of species at Weed Lake:

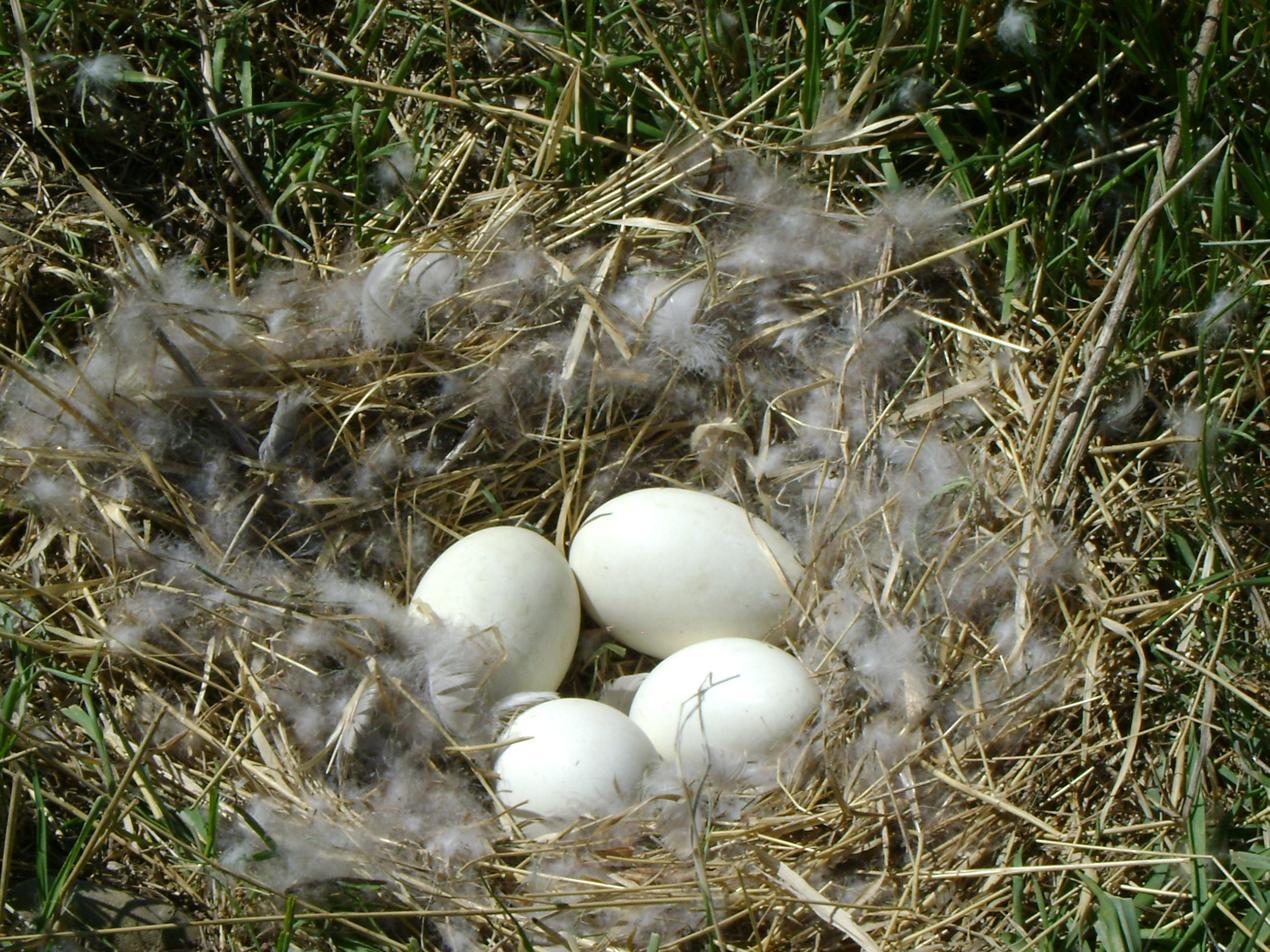
Geese eggs found at Weed Lake March 2015

=== Amphibians ===
- Boreal chorus frog

=== Birds ===
(It has been reported elsewhere that 172 species of bird have been observed at Weed Lake.)

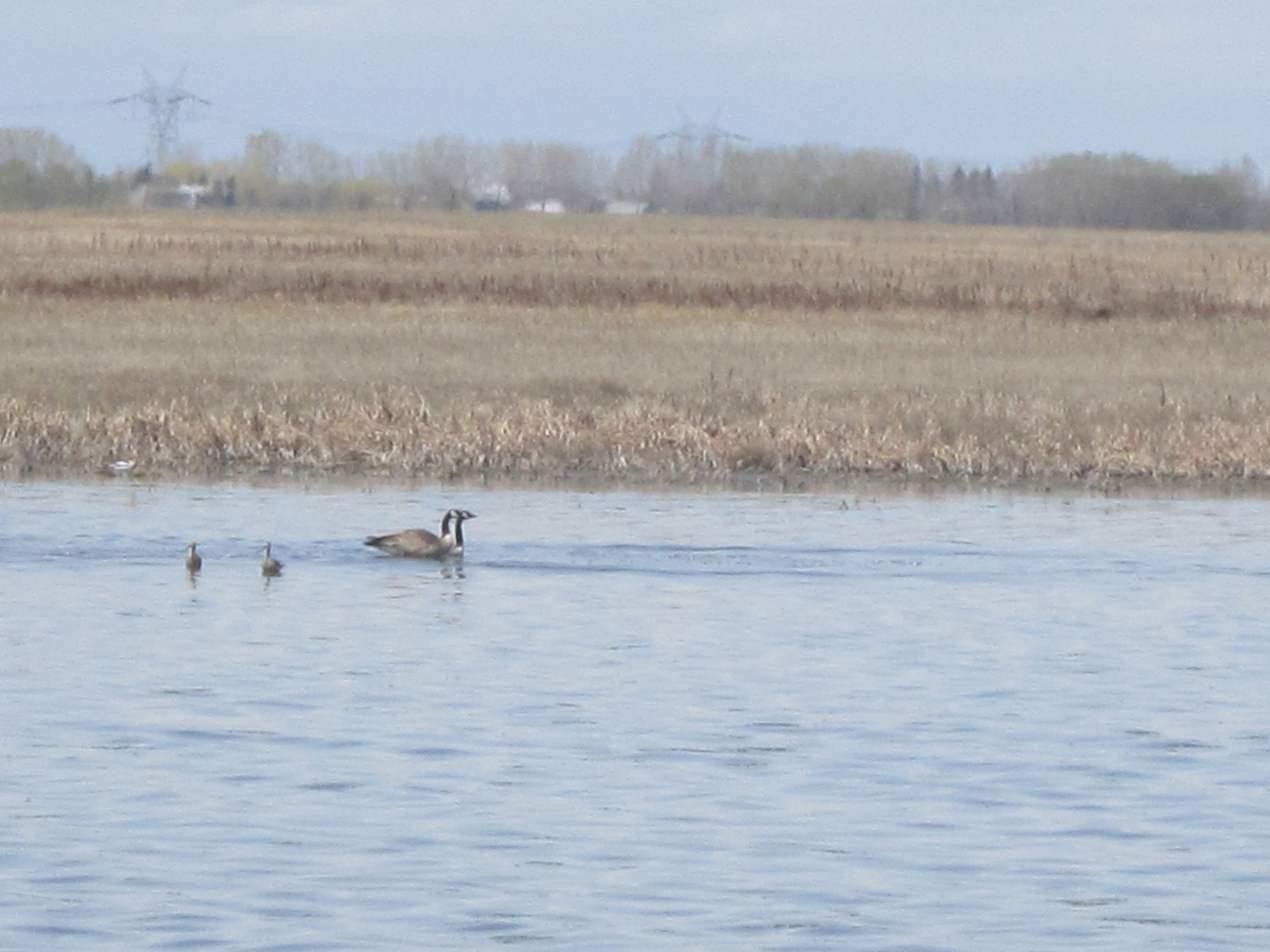
Weed Lake March 2015

- Black-necked stilt
- Black tern
- Northern shoveler
- American white pelican
- Blue jay
- Canada goose
- Great blue heron
- Trumpeter swan
- Mallard duck
- ruddy duck

=== Mammals ===
- Coyote
- Muskrat

=== Insects ===
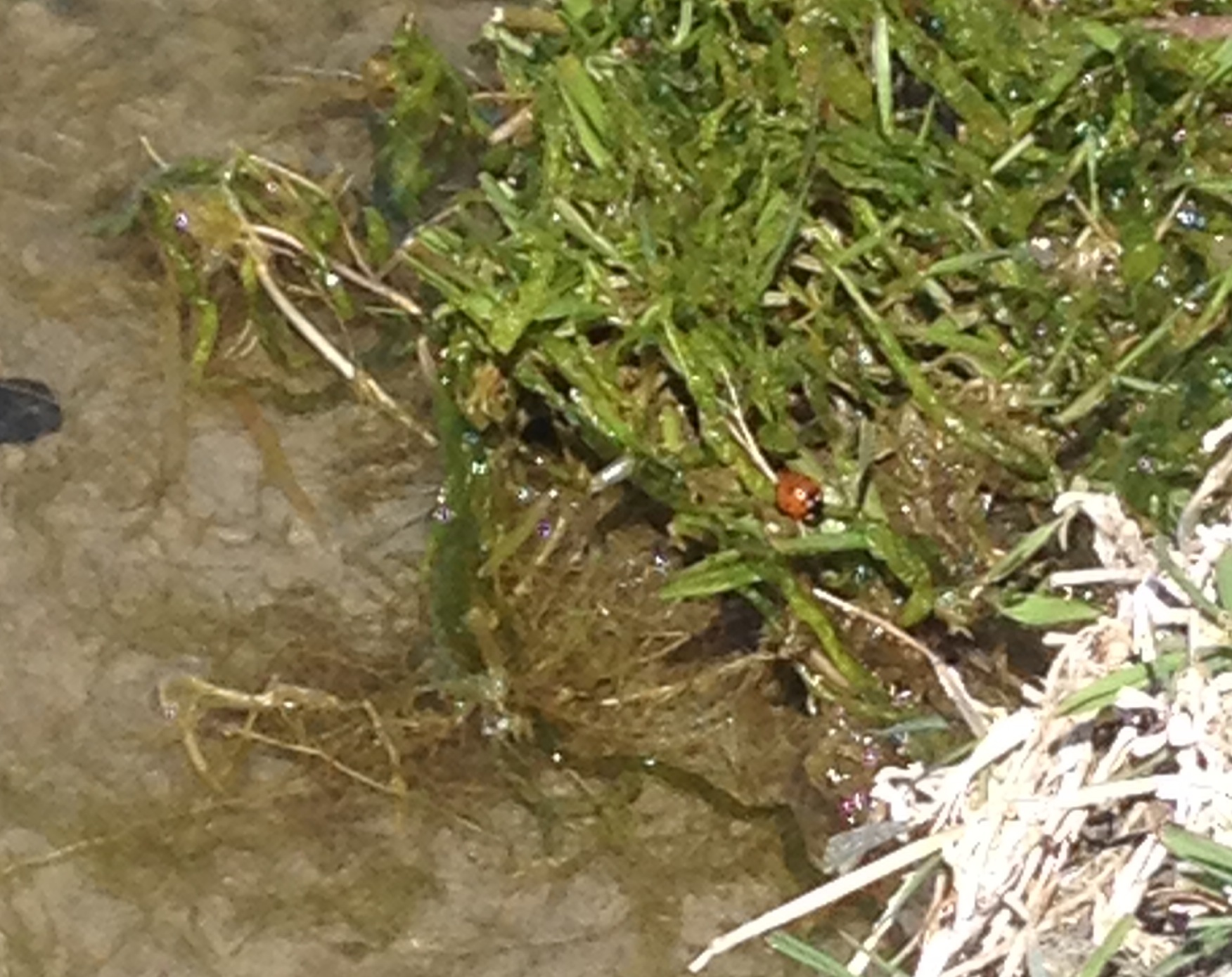
Lady bug at Weed Lake March 2015

- Butterflies
- Diving beetles
- Dragonflies
- Ladybugs
- Grass spiders (Agelenopsis)

=== Plants ===
- Algae
- Cattail
  - Bulrush
- Sage
- Duckweed
- Early blue violet
- Dandelion (Taraxacum officinale)
- Bladderwort
