= NMWA =

The acronym NMWA may refer to:

== Museums ==
- National Museum of Women in the Arts in Washington, D.C. in the U.S.
- The National Museum of Western Art in Tokyo, Japan
- National Museum of Wildlife Art in Jackson Hole, Wyoming

== Legislation ==
- National Minimum Wage Act 1998 Act of Parliament (U.K.)
