= Kendra Haste =

British sculptor

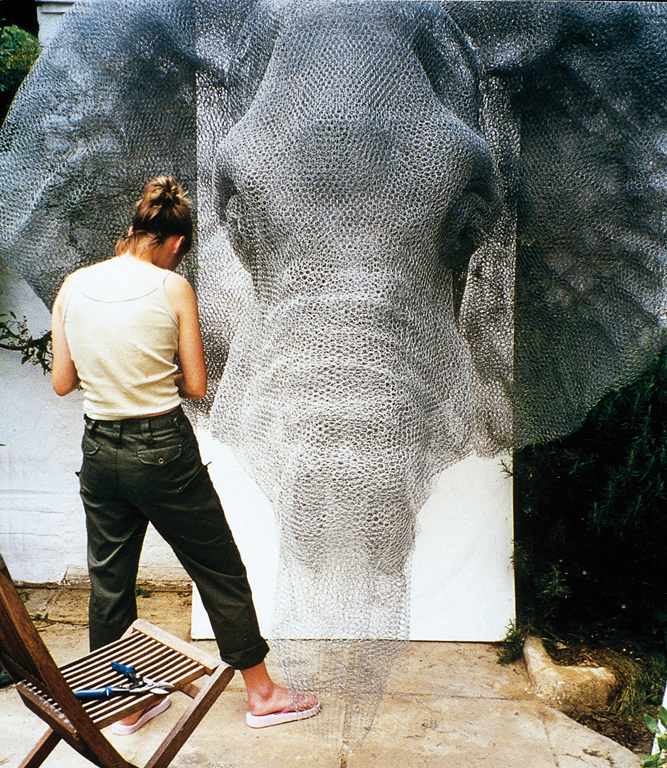
- Kendra Haste working on the Waterloo station elephant sculpture
- Born: 1971 (age 54–55); Putney, London
- Education: Wimbledon College of Art (1990), Camberwell College of Arts (1993), Royal College of Art

Kendra Haste is a British wildlife artist who produces both public and privately commissioned sculptures using galvanised chicken wire mesh to create wire sculptures of wild animals. She is a member of the Society of Wildlife Artists, the Royal British Society of Sculptors and the Society of Animal Artists. She lives in Surrey, England.

== Career ==
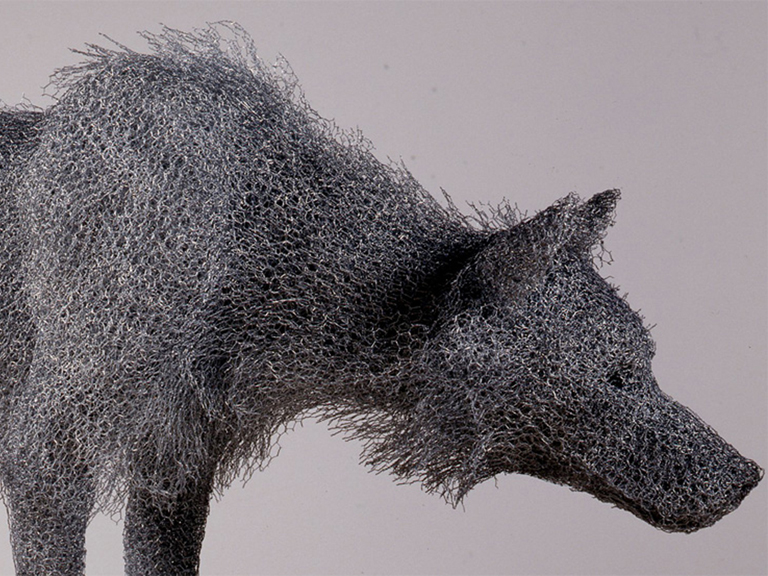
Detail of Haste's wire work on a timber wolf sculpture.

Haste was born in 1971 in Putney, London, where she grew up. She graduated from the Wimbledon College of Art in 1990, and in 1993 earned a Bachelor of Arts with Honours in illustration from the Camberwell College of Arts.

Haste went on to graduate from the Royal College of Art, where she first became interested in wire sculpture, using galvanised wire mesh over a steel armature, later on using the wire mesh as sculpting material on its own for indoor work. Haste's sculptures are generally created by building up many layers of wire mesh over the steel armature skeleton, spray finished with enamel paint. In 1999, her sculpture of a baboon won the BBC Wildlife Art Award.

Haste lives in Surrey, UK.

=== Historic Royal Palaces commission ===
In 2010 Haste was commissioned by Historic Royal Palaces to create a series of pieces, (thirteen in total), which tell the story of the Royal Menagerie that had existed at the Tower of London from 1210 until 1833. Throughout the 600 years that there was a menagerie at the Tower of London, apes and monkeys were always a feature. Baboons roamed the Tower freely until, in 1833, a child was killed by their aggressive behaviour. Soon after, the entire menagerie was moved to Regent's Park, to become what is today the London Zoo. Using research from the Tower of London archives, Haste returned the animals to their original locations around the Tower.

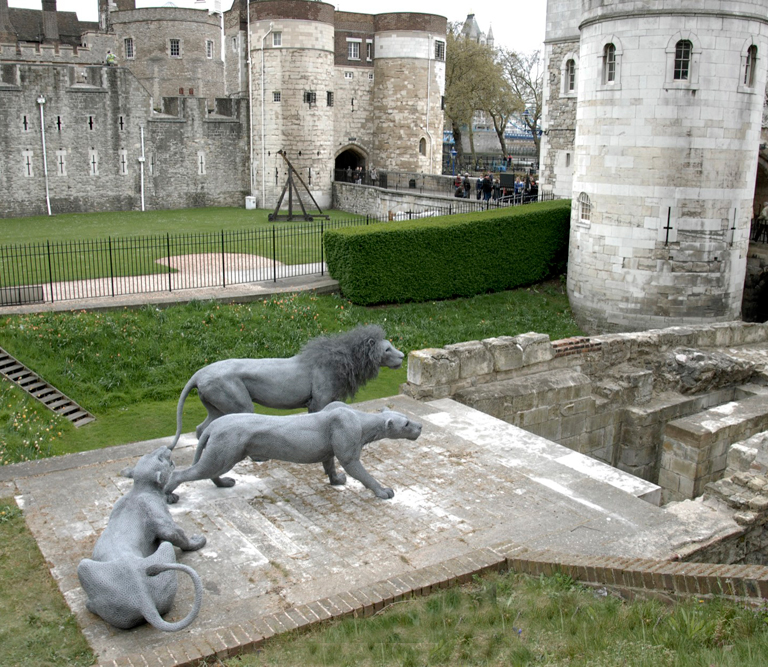
Three Barbary lions, gift of Frederick II to Henry III, 1235.

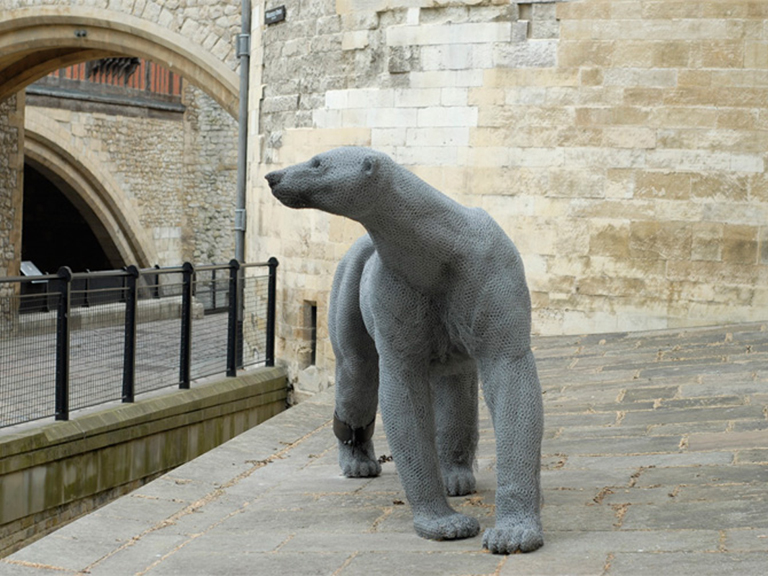
"White" bear, King Haakon II of Norway to Henry III, 1251.

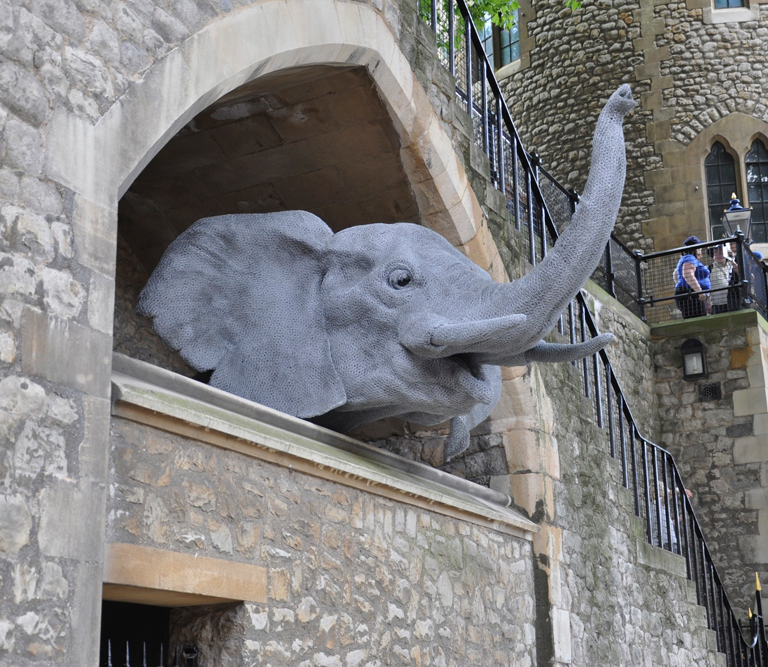
Elephant, gift of Louis IX to Henry III, 1255.

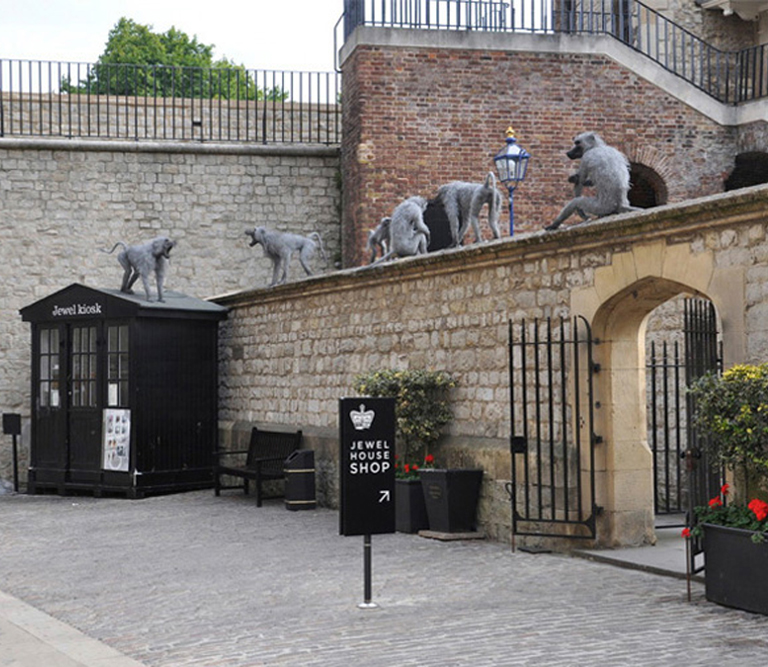
Baboon troop opposite the Jewel House

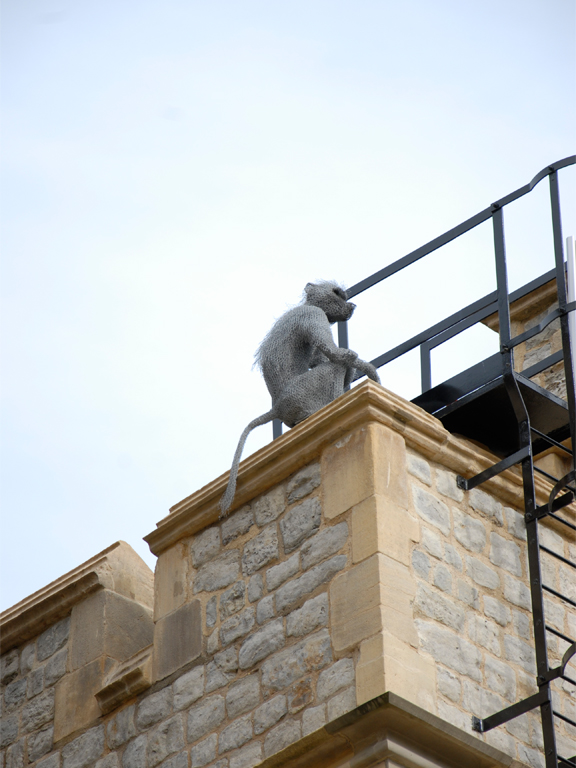
Baboon on the Brick Tower.

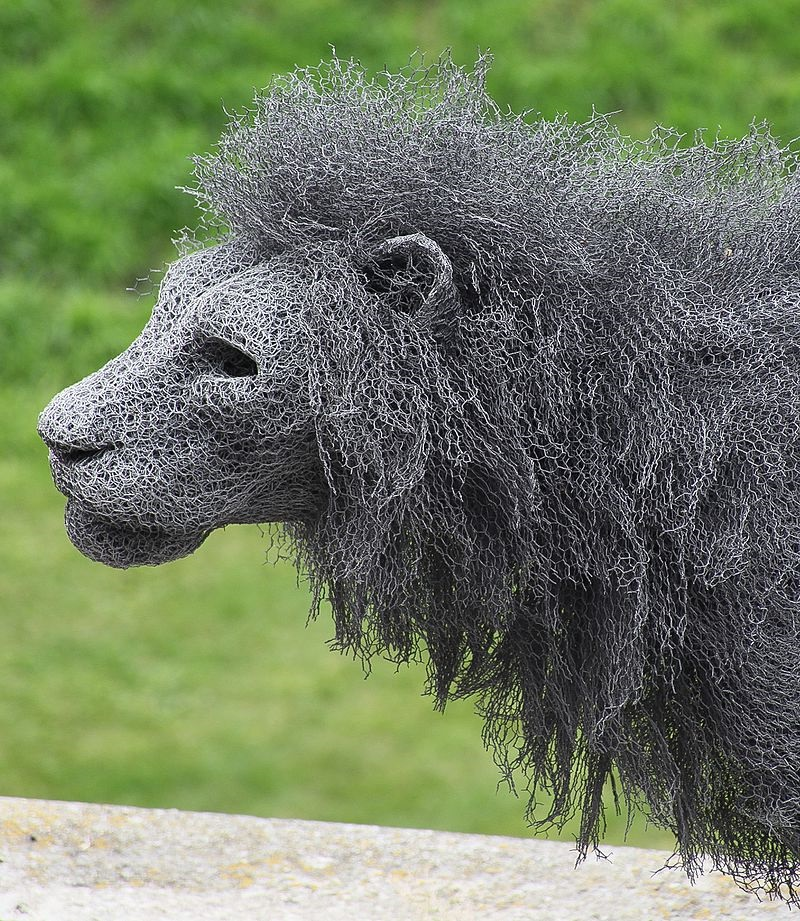
Lion in detail

=== Waterloo Elephant ===
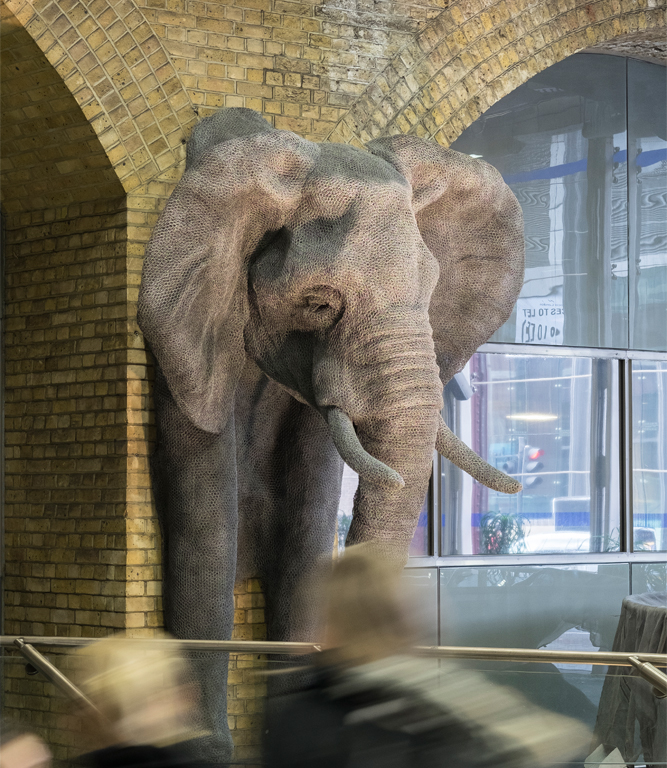
Haste's Elephant at Waterloo tube station.

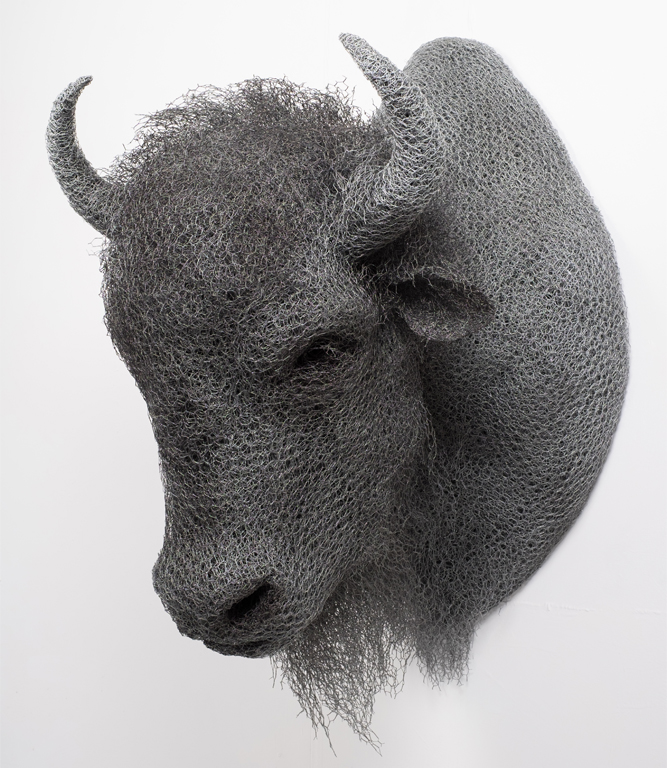
Bison Head, National Museum of Wildlife Art, Wyoming.

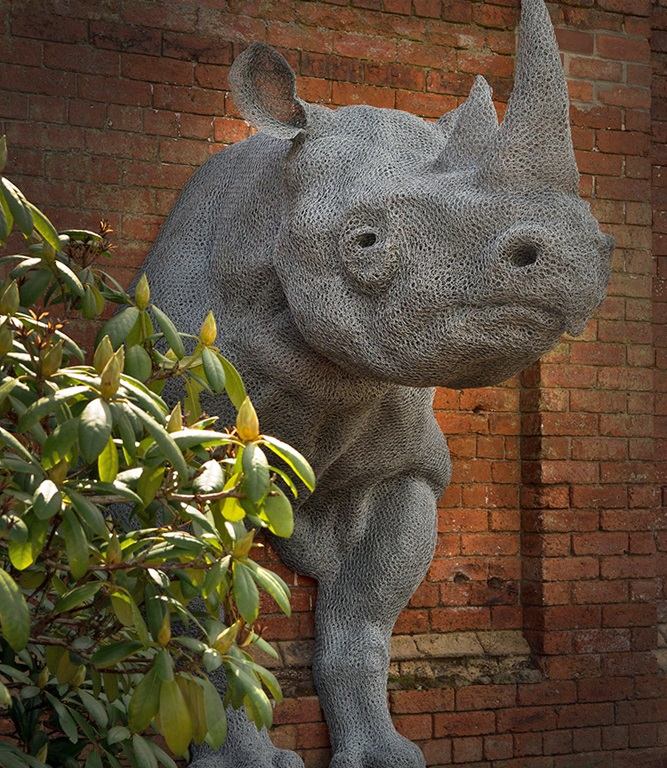
Rhinoceros installed at Cannon Hall Museum, Barnsley, UK.

Haste's Waterloo Elephant was originally commissioned by the London Underground as part of its Platform for Art programme and set up at the Gloucester Road tube station. After the success of Haste's "Underground Safari" pieces, the London Underground purchased the African elephant sculpture and installed it near the ticket hall of a new Jubilee line extension at the Waterloo tube station. The new location is on the site of the old Astley's Amphitheatre – sometimes considered the world's first circus ring – where in 1828 an elephant that was part of the show was frightened and blundered into the crowd.

== Exhibitions ==
=== Solo ===
Haste's solo exhibitions include:

- Parnham House, Beaminster, Dorset, (1998),
- Underground Safari, Gloucester Road Underground station, (2000),
- NDUTU, Davies & Tooth, Air Gallery, London (2003),
- NDUTU, Midlands Art Centre, Birmingham.

=== Group ===
Haste's participation in group exhibitions include:

- Annual Exhibition, Society of Wildlife Artists, (1995-9),
- Born Free Exhibition, Fitchs Ark, London, (1996),
- Art of the Rainforest, Nature in Art, Gloucester, (1997),
- MA Degree show, Royal College of Art, London, (1998),
- Graduate Multi-media Show, Candid Arts Trust, (1998),
- Graduate Exhibition, Minsmere RSPB reserve, Suffolk, UK, (1998),
- Nature, Collyer Bristow Gallery, London, (1999),
- Young British Sculptors, Beaux Arts Gallery, Bath, UK, (2000),
- Underground Safari, London Underground, (2001),
- Wild Tigers of Bandhavgarh, The Burrell Collection, Glasgow Museums & Art Galleries, (2000),
- Art 2001, Davies and Tooth, London, (2001),
- Three generations of Sculptors, Beaux Arts Gallery, Bath, UK (2001),
- Art London, Davies and Tooth, London, (2001),
- Patrick Davies Contemporary Art, (2003),
- Let's Dance! Animals – Art and Design Exhibition, Chimei Museum, Tainan (2016).

== Other works ==
Other works by Haste include:

- Rhinoceros, Cannon Hall, Yorkshire, UK,
- Bison Head (2016) National Museum of Wildlife Art, Jackson, Wyoming,

== Awards and affiliations ==
Haste won the Artists for Nature Foundation Award (where she is a member) in 1997, the Dale Rowney Illustration award in 1998, and the BBC Wildlife Art Award in 1999. Haste is featured among 95 sculptors in Guy Portelli's book "Modern British Sculpture".

Haste is a member of the Society of Wildlife Artists, the Royal British Society of Sculptors and a signature member of the Society of Animal Artists.
