= National Museum of Wildlife Art =

Coordinates: 43.518953°N 110.749041°W

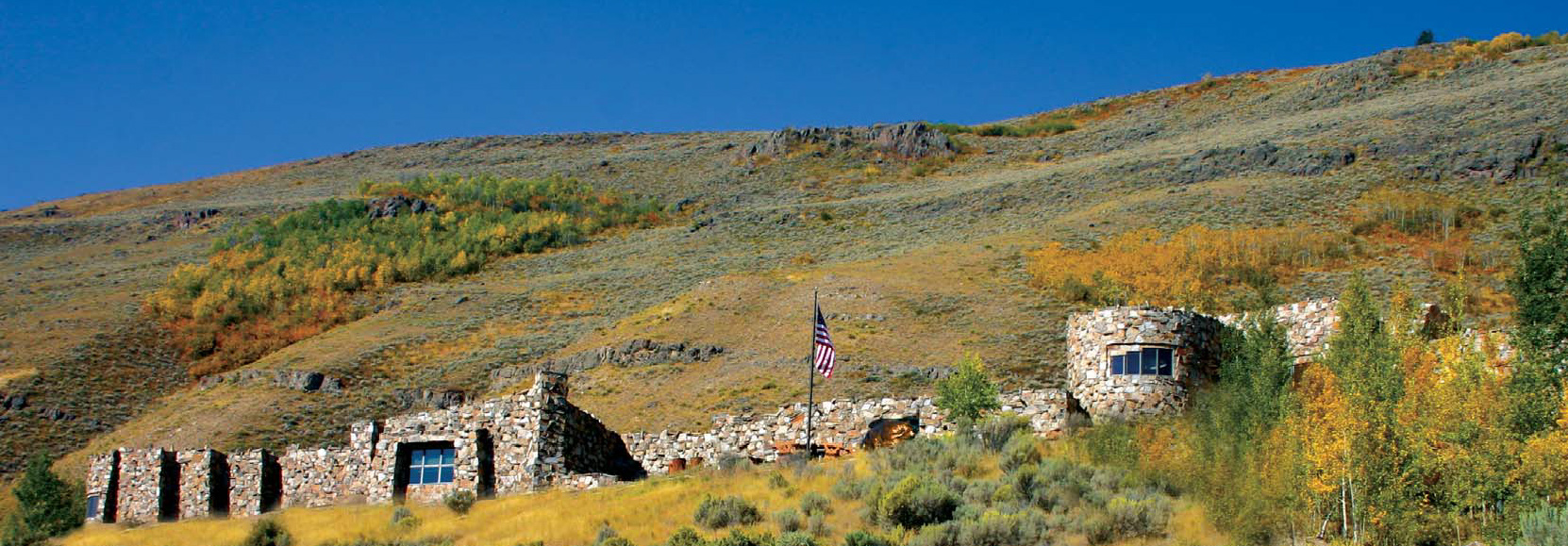
- The National Museum of Wildlife Art
- Established: May 16, 1987
- Location: 2820 Rungius Road; Jackson, Wyoming 83001 United States
- Type: Wildlife Art
- Visitors: 85,000+ annually
- Directors: Steve Seamons, Museum Director
- Curators: Kennis Forte, Ph.D. Curator of Art
- Website: www.wildlifeart.org

The National Museum of Wildlife Art (NMWA) is a museum located in Jackson Hole, Wyoming, United States that preserves and exhibits wildlife art. The 51,000 square foot building with its Idaho quartzite façade was inspired by the ruins of Slains Castle in Aberdeenshire, Scotland and echoes the hillside behind the facility. Located on a bluff called East Gros Ventre Butte in the midst of a real wildlife habitat, the institution overlooks the National Elk Refuge and is situated 2.5 miles north of the town of Jackson. The core of the collections reflects traditional and contemporary realism. The museum's centerpiece is a collection of works by Carl Rungius (1869–1959) and Bob Kuhn (1920–2007). In addition to 14 galleries, the museum has a sculpture trail, museum shop, restaurant, children's discovery gallery, and library. More than 80,000 people visit every year, and over 10,000 children visit the museum each year, often as part of their school curricula. The Museum is a nonprofit.

== History ==
The museum was founded in 1987 by William and Joffa Kerr and a group of friends. William Kerr was the son of Robert S. Kerr. It was initially situated on the Jackson Town Square and was at first called the Wildlife of the American West Museum. The Kerrs donated the core of the museum's holdings from their own collection. In 1994, the NMWA opened a 51,000-square-foot (4,700 m^{2}) facility 2.5 miles (4.0 km) north of its previous location, across Highway 89 from the National Elk Refuge. In September 2007, the museum dedicated a new monumental sculpture of five elk called Wapiti Trail by American sculptor Bart Walter.

== Collections ==
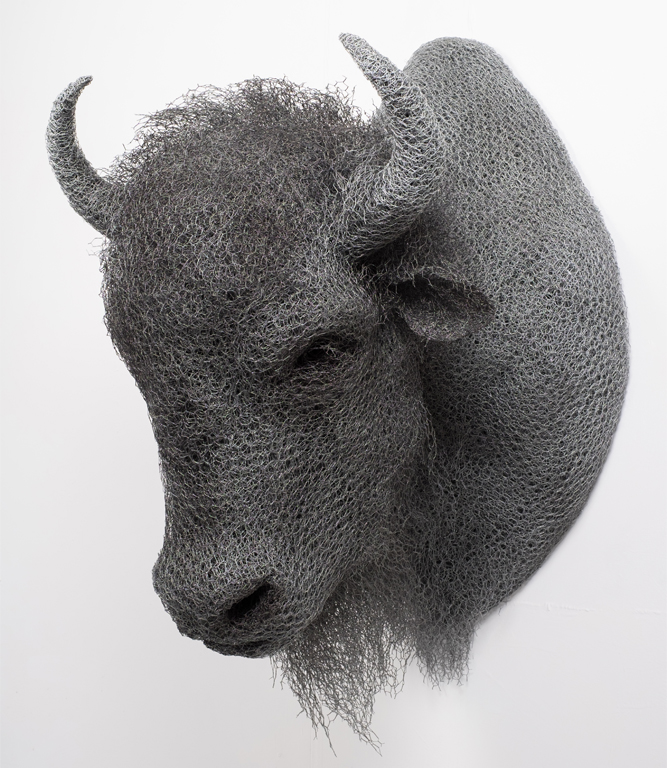
Bison Head, Kendra Haste.

As of 2012 there were more than 5,000 cataloged artworks and 550 artists represented in the museum's permanent collection. Characteristic examples, along with those of Rungius and Kuhn, include works by Albert Bierstadt, George Catlin, Karl Bodmer, Charles Marion Russell, Frederic Remington, John James Audubon, N.C. Wyeth, Friedrich Wilhelm Kuhnert, Bruno Liljefors, Robert Bateman, Simon Gudgeon, Tucker Smith, and Mark Catesby. Additionally, there are works depicting wildlife by Auguste Rodin, Picasso, Rembrandt, Archibald Thorburn, Daniel Huntington, Rosa Bonheur, Georgia O'Keeffe, Walton Ford, Andy Warhol and Kendra Haste.

== Sculpture Trail ==
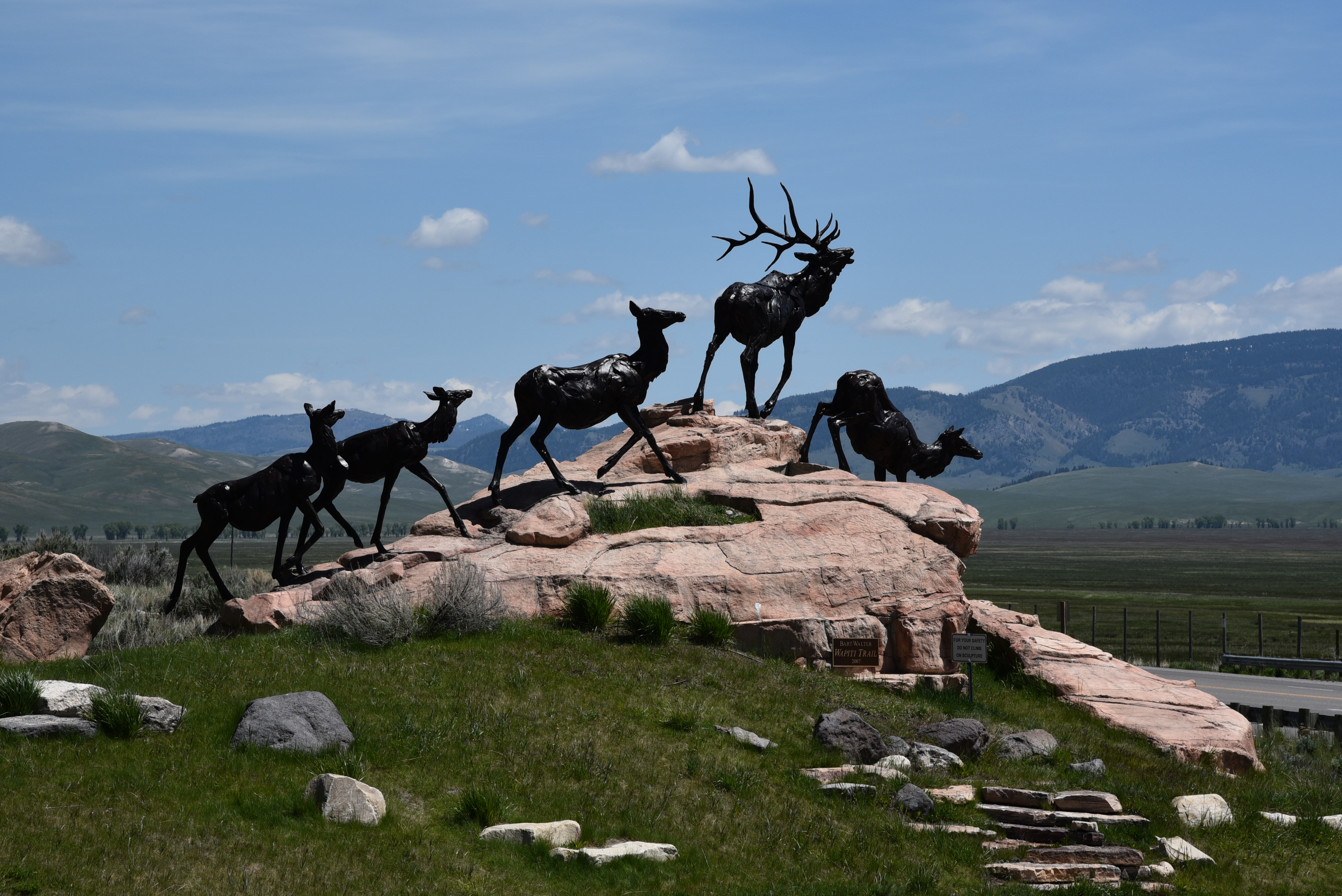
Wapiti Trail bronze sculpture by Bart Walter

The museum's Sculpture Trail, designed by award-winning landscape architect Walter J. Hood, opened in fall 2011. The three-quarter-mile long trail extends to the north and south of the museum. When complete, the trail will host 30 permanent and temporary works of art; twenty works of art are installed. The trail branches into several footpaths with bridges and staircases giving access to a variety of vantage points and views.

Free and open to the public, the Sculpture Trail is proximate to the main bike pathway into Jackson from the north and south. The pathway connects to the Sculpture Trail via an underpass, providing access to the town of Jackson and Grand Teton National Park.

== Education ==
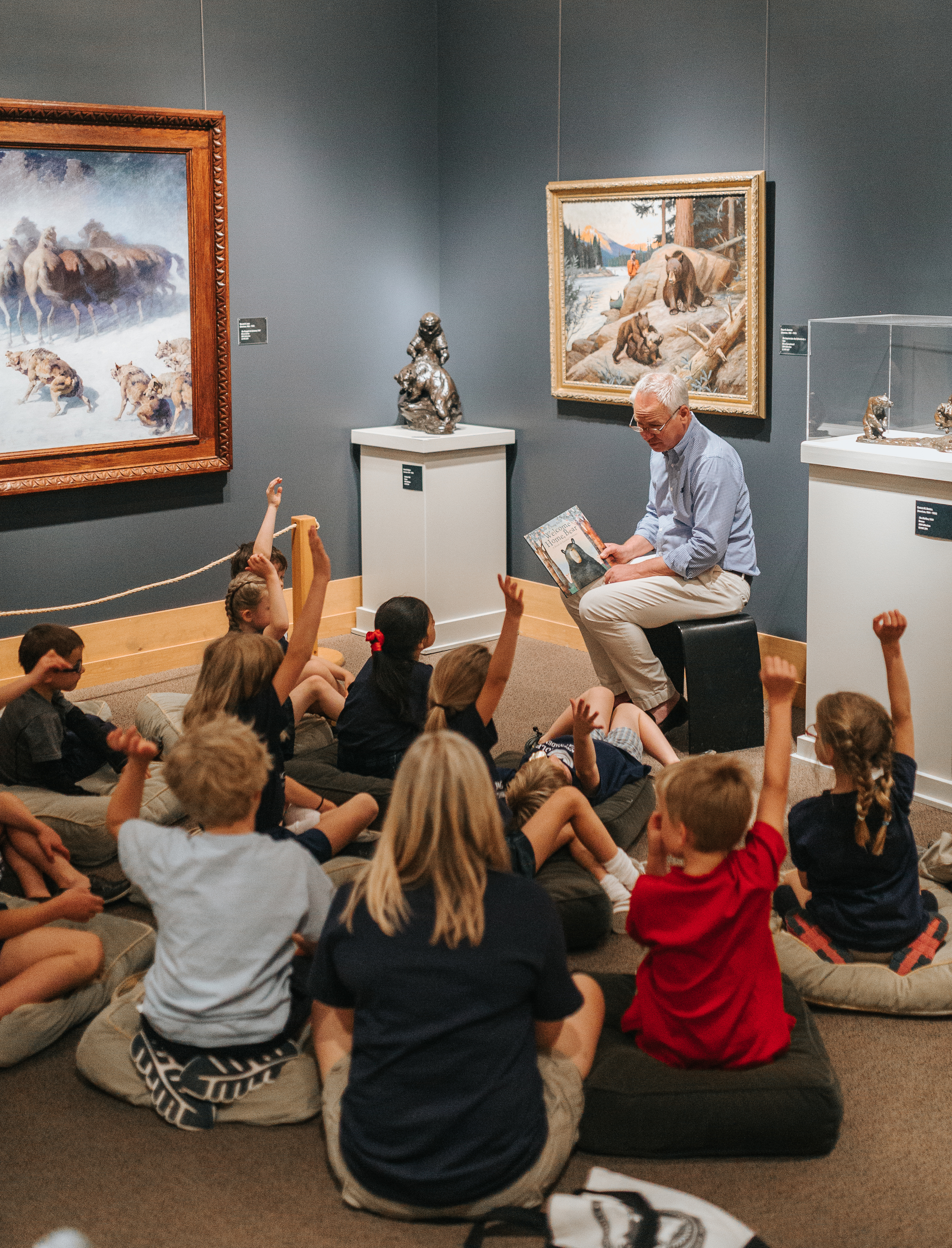
Fables, Feathers & Fur is a weekly reading and art-making program for children ages 3–6.

The museum offers several educational programs segmented by audience and type of learning strategy to accommodate a range of ages and learning styles, both formal and informal.

The Lillian Thomason Gemar Internship in the Education and Exhibitions Department and the McGee Foundation Curatorial Internship in the Curatorial Department are the two primary internship opportunities. Internships are offered to current graduate students and recent graduates with requisite coursework, experience, and background. The museum also offers additional unpaid internships.

== Library and archives ==
The Library is a non-circulating research library with an emphasis on material relating to wildlife art and artists. Additional material includes general art history, art conservation, natural history, wildlife biology, wildlife cinematography, conservation, and photography. The collection contains a wide variety of materials including books, journals, artist biographical files, video and DVD recordings, and Museum publications. The Library and Archives are open by appointment for browsing, reference, and research.

== Honors and awards ==
In 1994, the National Museum of Wildlife Art received the Wyoming Humanities Award for exemplary efforts in fostering the humanities in Wyoming. On May 8, 2008, President George W. Bush signed Senate Bill 2739, a Public Lands bill that contained a provision recognizing the NMWA as the "National Museum of Wildlife Art of the United States".

== Rungius Medal ==
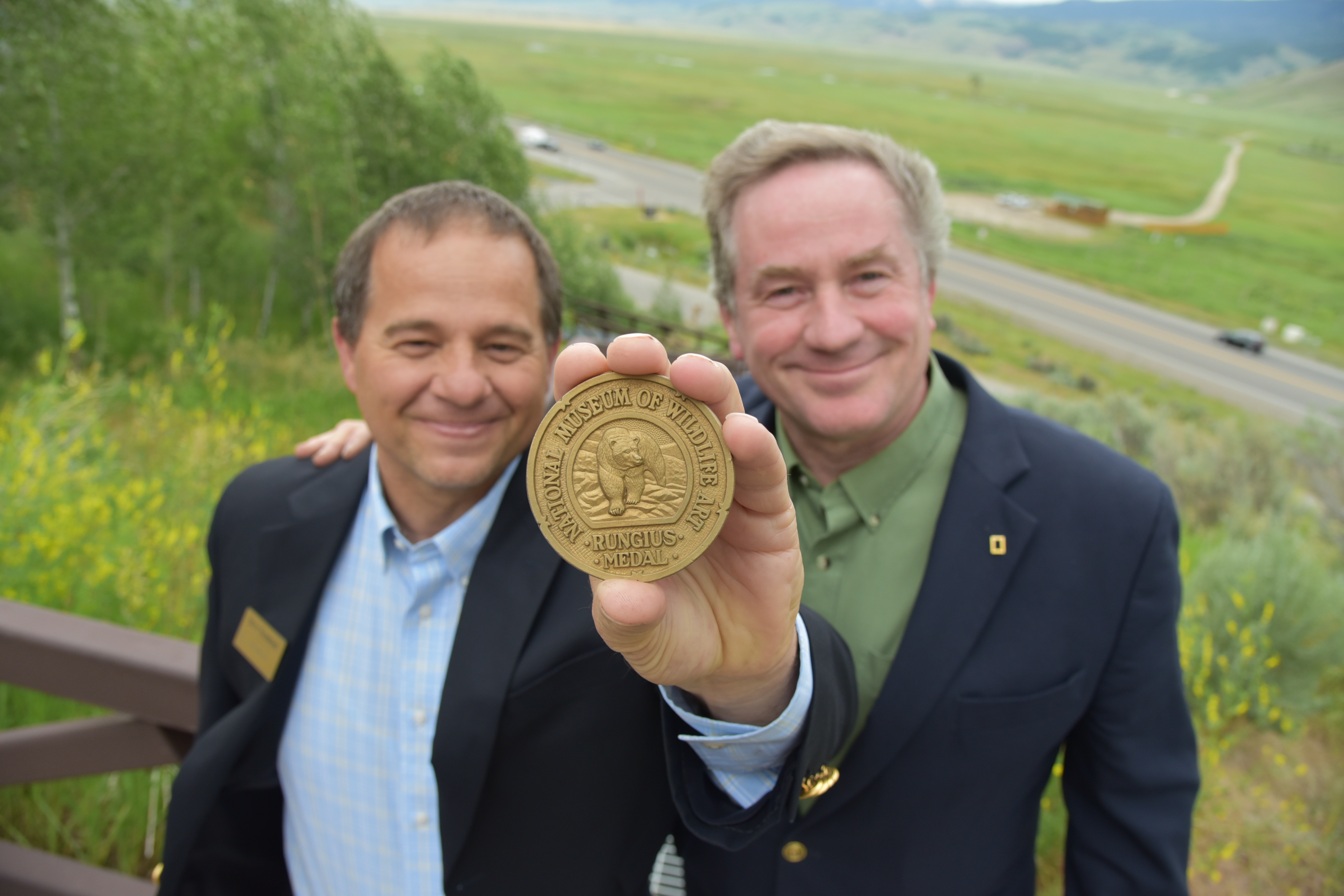
NMWA Director Steve Seamons and National Geographic Photographer Joel Sartore pose with the Rungius Medal in June, 2017.

The Rungius Medal, named in honor of renowned artist Carl Rungius, is presented upon occasion by the National Museum of Wildlife Art to individuals who have made lifetime or extraordinary contributions to the artistic interpretation and preservation of wildlife and its habitat. In establishing the Rungius medal, the museum recognizes outstanding individuals and organizations across fields ranging from the fine arts to the natural sciences. The Rungius Medal is the museum's highest honor.

Rungius Medal winners: Joel Sartore, 2017; John F. Turner, 2010; Bill and Joffa Kerr, 2007; Clifford P. Hansen, 2006; E. O. Wilson, 2005; Kenneth Bunn, 2004; J. Michael Fay, 2003; David Love, 2002; Bertram C. “Bert” Raynes, 2001; Jane Goodall, 2001; Robert Bateman, 2000; Kent Ullberg, 1996; Roger Tory Peterson, 1994; Wallace Stegner, 1993; Bob Kuhn, 1992; Robert L. Lewin, 1990; Mardy Murie, 1989; John Clymer, 1988.
