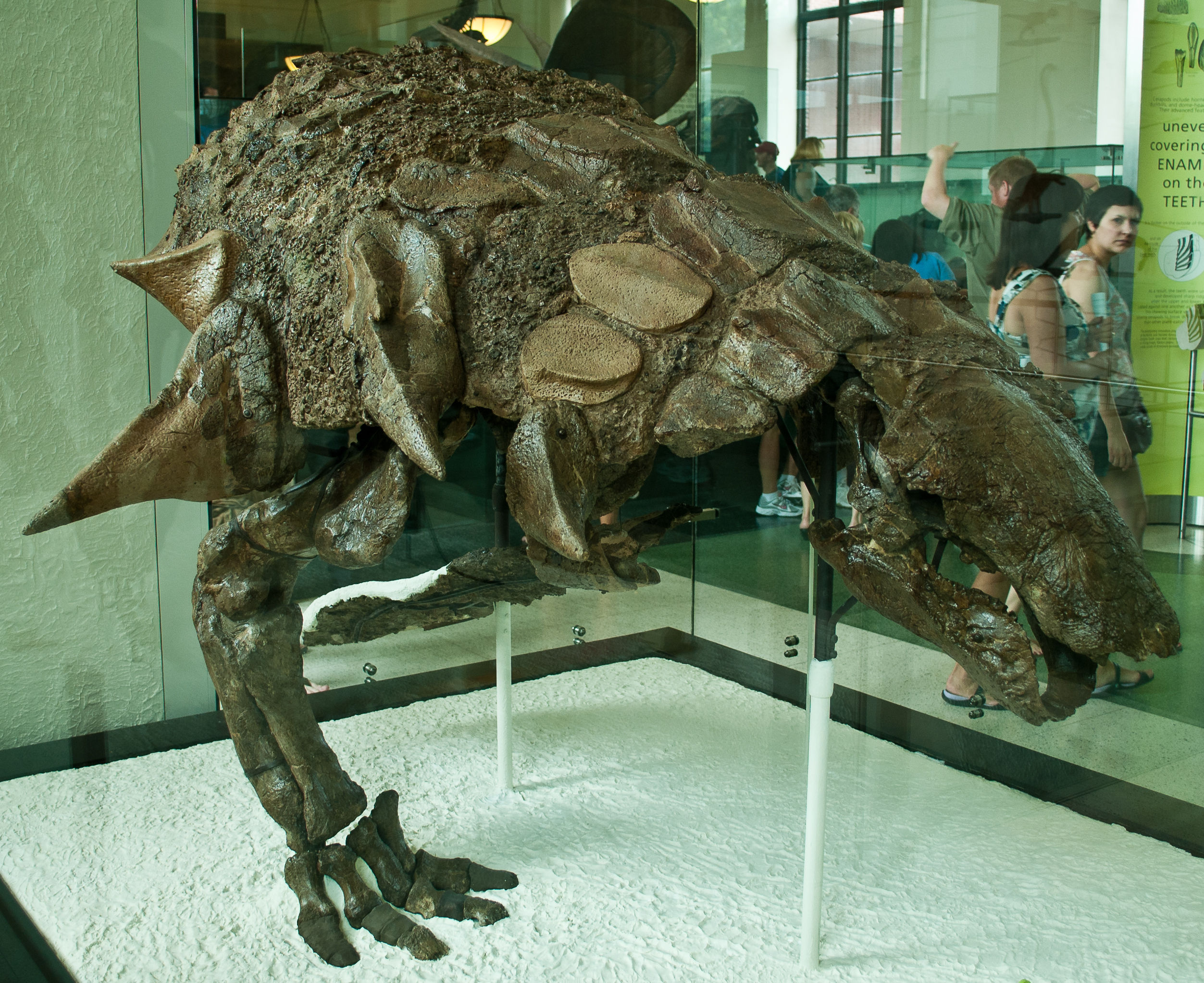
- Mounted skeleton of E. rugosidens, specimen AMNH 5665

Scientific classification
- Kingdom: Animalia
- Phylum: Chordata
- Class: Reptilia
- Clade: Dinosauria
- Clade: †Ornithischia
- Clade: †Thyreophora
- Clade: †Ankylosauria
- Family: †Nodosauridae
- Subfamily: †Nodosaurinae
- Clade: †Panoplosaurini
- Genus: †Edmontonia; Sternberg, 1928

Type species
- †Edmontonia longiceps Sternberg, 1928

Species
- †E. rugosidens (Gilmore, 1930 [originally Palaeoscincus rugosidens])

Synonyms
- Chassternbergia Bakker, 1988

= Edmontonia =

Edmontonia Temporal range: Late Cretaceous, 76.5–69 Ma

Extinct genus of dinosaurs

Edmontonia is a genus of panoplosaurin nodosaurid dinosaur from the Late Cretaceous Period of what is now western North America. It is named after the Edmonton Formation (now the Horseshoe Canyon Formation in Canada), the unit of rocks where it was first found.

== Description ==
=== Size and general build ===
Size comparison

Edmontonia was bulky, broad and tank-like. Its length has been estimated at 6.6 m (22 ft). In 2010, Gregory S. Paul considered both main Edmontonia species, E. longiceps and E. rugosidens, to be equally long at six metres and weigh three tonnes.

Edmontonia had small, oval ridged bony plates on its back and head and many sharp spikes along its sides. The four largest spikes jutted out from the shoulders on each side, the second of which was split into subspines in E. rugosidens specimens. Its skull had a pear-like shape when viewed from above. Its neck and shoulders were protected by three halfrings made of large keeled plates.

=== Distinguishing traits ===
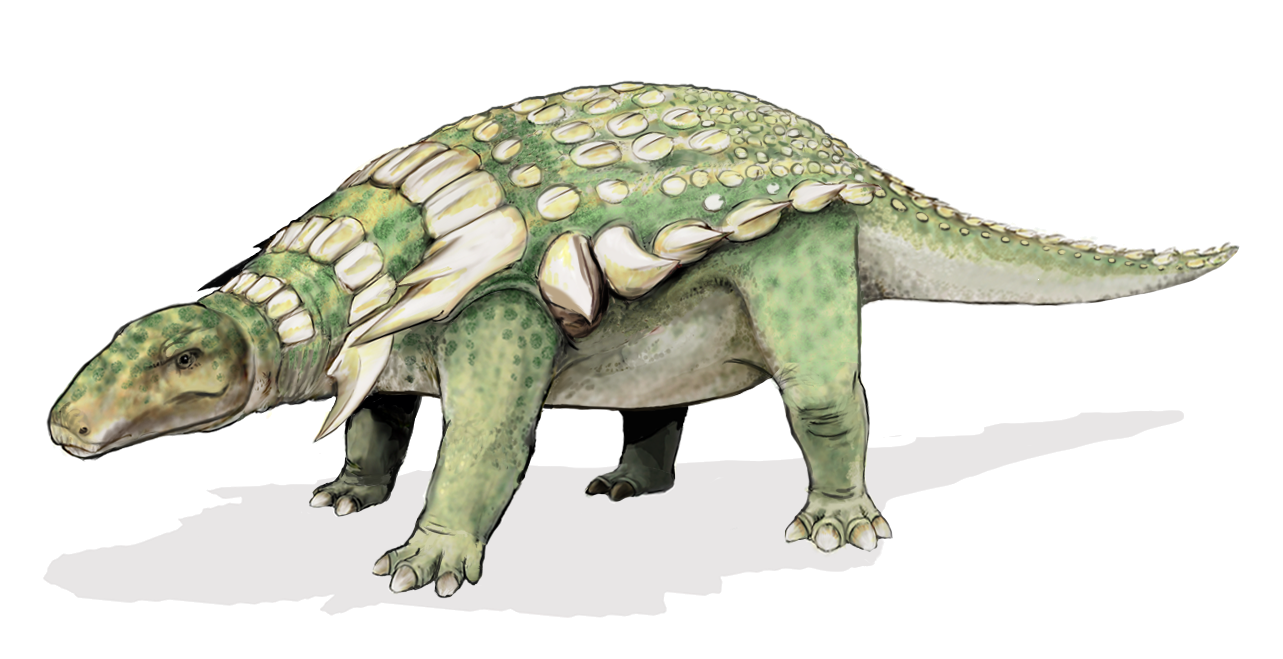
Restoration of E. rugosidens

In 1990, Kenneth Carpenter established some diagnostic traits for the genus as a whole, mainly comparing it with its close relative Panoplosaurus. In top view, the snout has more parallel sides. The skull armour has a smooth surface. In the palate, the vomer is keeled. The neural arches and neural spines are shorter than those of Panoplosaurus. The sacrum proper consists of three sacral vertebrae. In the shoulder girdle, the scapula and coracoid are not fused.

Carpenter also indicated in which way the main species differed from each other. The type species, Edmontonia longiceps, is distinguished from E. rugosidens in lacking sideways projecting osteoderms behind the eye sockets; having tooth rows that are less divergent; possessing a more narrow palate; having a sacrum that is wider than long and more robust; and in having shorter spikes at the sides. Also, an ossified cheek plate, known from E. rugosidens specimens, has not been found with Edmontonia longiceps.

=== Skeleton ===
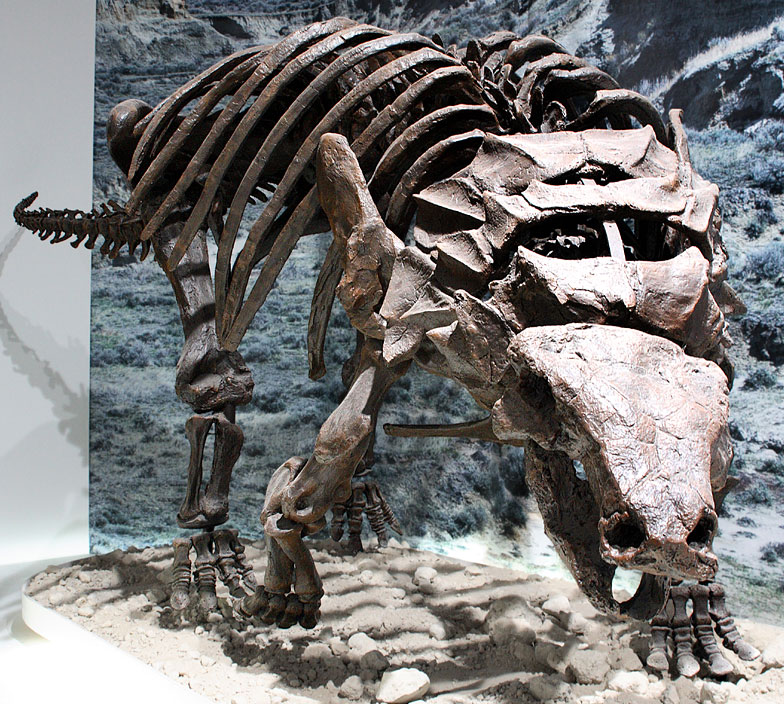
Restored E. rugosidens skeleton without back armour

The skull of Edmontonia, up to half a metre long, is somewhat elongated with a protruding truncated snout. The snout carried a horny upper beak and the front snout bones, the premaxillae, were toothless. The cutting edge of the upper beak continued into the maxillary tooth rows, each containing fourteen to seventeen small teeth. In each dentary of the lower jaws, eighteen to twenty-one teeth were present. In the sides of the snout large depressions were present, "nasal vestibules", that each possessed two smaller openings. The top of these was a horizontal oval and represented the bony external nostril, the entrance to the nasal cavity, the normal air passage. The more rounded second opening below and obliquely in front, was the entrance to a "paranasal" tract, running along the outer side of the nasal cavity, in a somewhat lower position. A study by Matthew Vickaryous in 2006 proved for the first time the presence of multiple openings in a nodosaurid; such structures had already been well established in ankylosaurids. The air tracts are however, much simpler than in the typical ankylosaurid condition, and are not convoluted while lacking bony turbinate bones. The nasal cavity is separated into two halves along the midline by a bone wall. This septum is continued to below by the vomers, which are keeled, the keel featuring a pendulum-shaped appendage. Another similarity with Ankylosauridae is the presence of a secondary bone palate, a possible case of parallel evolution. This has been shown too for Panoplosaurus.

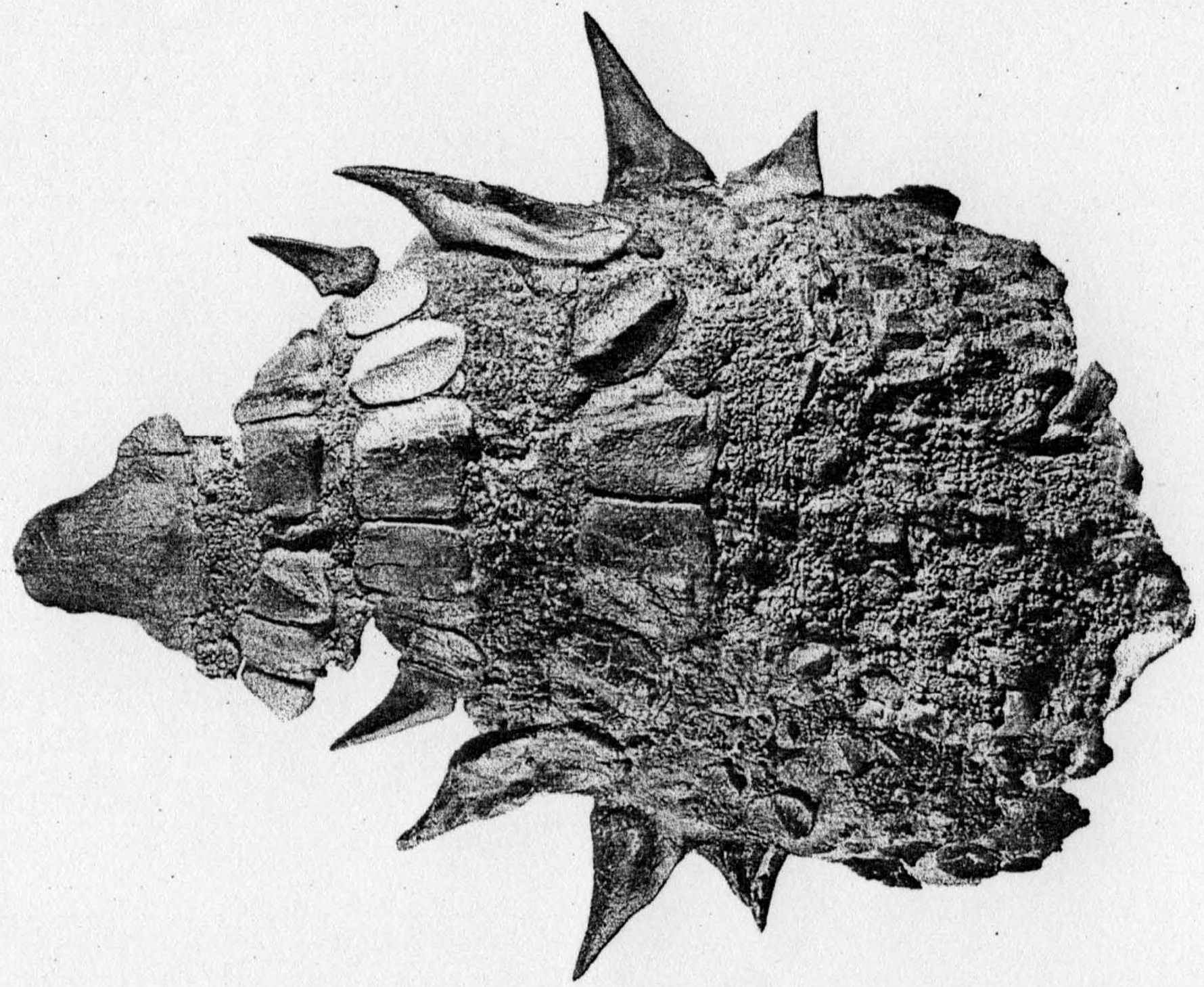
The AMNH 5381 specimen of E. rugosidens, 1915 (first referred to Palaeoscincus by Matthew in 1922), showing the position of the dermal armour

The head armour tiles, or caputegulae, are smooth. Details differ between the various specimens but all share a large central nasal tile on the snout, bend large "loreal" tiles at the rear snout edges and a large central caputegula on the skull roof. The tiles behind the upper eye socket rim in Edmontonia longiceps do not stick out as much as in E. rugosidens, combined with a more narrow, pointed snout in the former. Some E. rugosidens specimens are known that possess a "cheek plate" above the lower jaw. Contrary to that discovered with Panoplosaurus, it is "free-floating", not fused with the lower jaw bone.

The vertebral column contains about eight neck vertebrae, about twelve "free" back vertebrae, a "sacral rod" of four fused rear dorsal vertebrae, three sacral vertebrae, two caudosacrals and at least twenty, but probably about forty, tail vertebrae. In the neck the first two vertebrae, the atlas and axis, are fused. In the shoulder girdle, the coracoid has a rectangular profile, in contrast to the more rounded shape with Panoplosaurus. Two sternal plates are present, connected to sternal ribs. The forelimb is robust but relatively long. In Edmontonia longiceps and E. rugosidens the deltopectoral crest of the humerus is gradually rounded. The metacarpus is robust compared to that of Panoplosaurus. The hand very likely was tetradactyl, having four fingers. The exact number of phalanges is unknown but the formula was by W.P. Coombs suggested to be 2-3-3-4-?.

=== Osteoderms ===
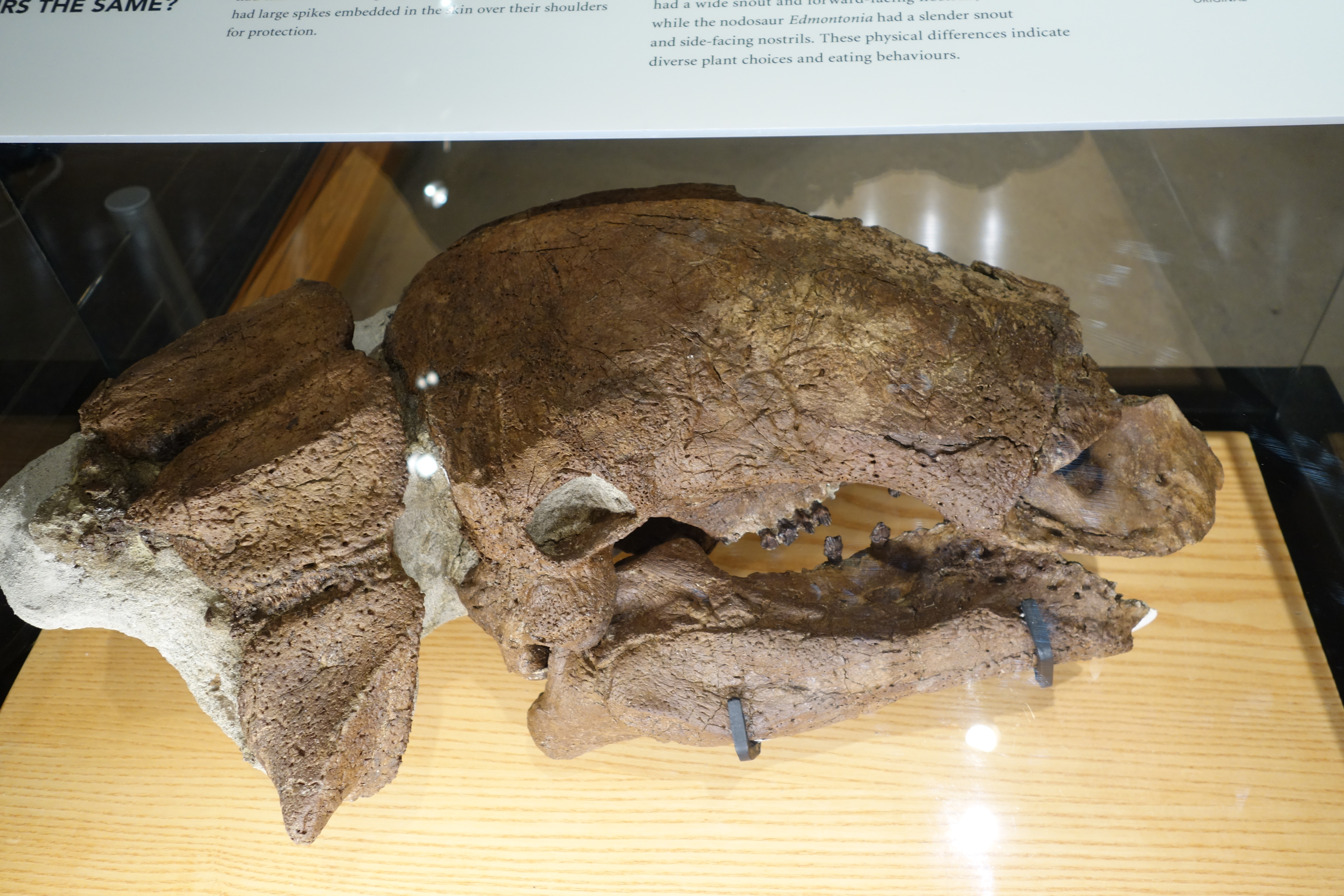
Skull and neck armor

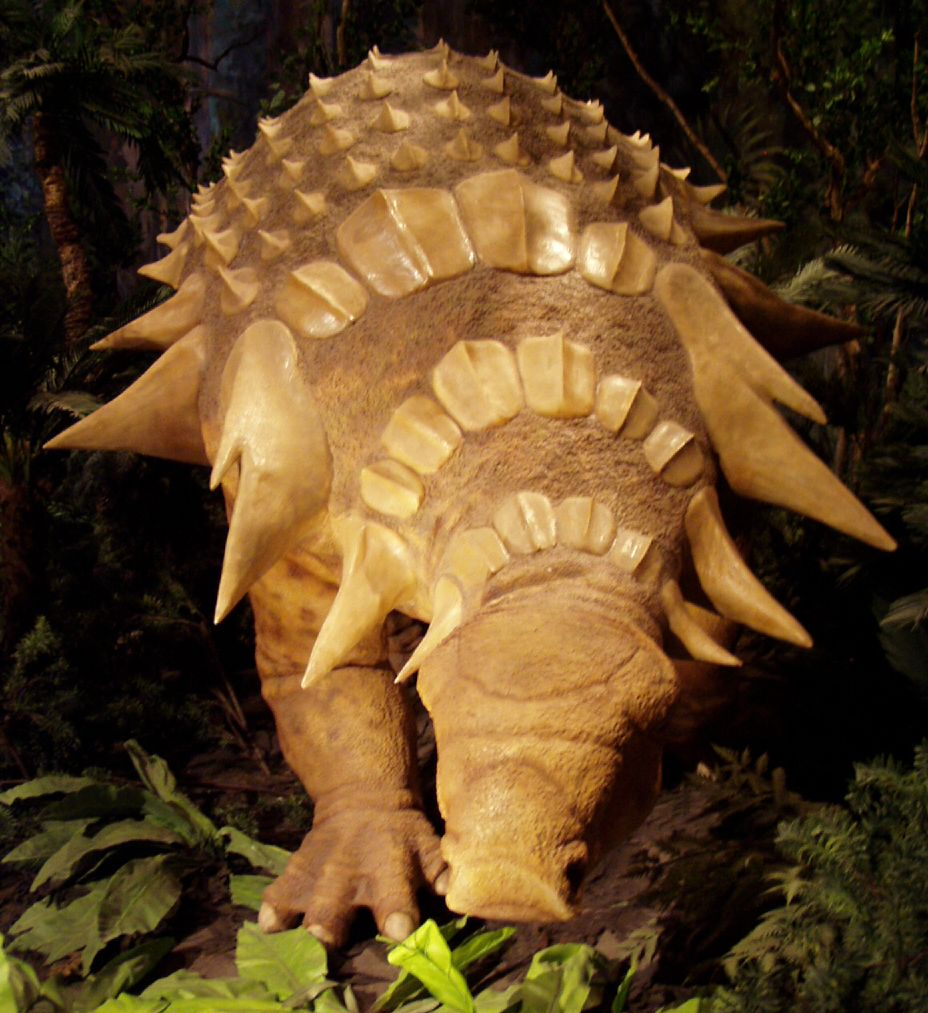
Edmontonia reconstruction in Royal Tyrrell Museum of Palaeontology

Apart from the head armour, the body was covered with osteoderms, skin ossifications. The configuration of the armour of Edmontonia is relatively well known, much of it having been discovered in articulation. The neck and shoulder region was protected by three cervical halfrings, each consisting of fused rounded rectangular, asymmetrically keeled, bone plates. These halfrings did not have a continuous underlying bone band. The first and second halfrings each had three pairs of segments. Below each lower end of the second halfring a side spike was present, a separate triangular osteoderm pointing obliquely forward. In the third halfring over the shoulders, the two pairs of central segments are bordered on each side by a very large forward-pointing spike that is bifurcated, featuring a secondary point above the main one. A third large spike behind it points more sideways; a smaller fourth one, often connected to the third at the base, is directed obliquely to behind. The row of side spikes is continued to the rear but there the osteoderms are much lower, curving strongly to behind, with the point overhanging the rear edge. Gilmore had trouble believing that the shoulder spikes really pointed to the front as this would have greatly hampered the animal while moving through vegetation. He suggested that the points had shifted during the burial of the carcass. However, Carpenter and G.S. Paul, trying to reposition the spikes, found that it was impossible to rotate them without losing conformity with the remainder of the armour. The side spikes have solid, not hollow, bases. The spikes differ in size between E. rugosidens individuals; those of the E. longiceps holotype are relatively small.

Behind the third halfring the back and hip are covered by numerous transverse rows of much smaller oval keeled osteoderms. These are not ordered in longitudinal rows. The front rows have plates oriented along the length of the body, but to the rear the long axis of these osteoderms gradually rotates sideways, their keels ultimately running transversely. Rosettes are lacking. The configuration of the tail armour is unknown. The larger plates of all body parts were connected by small ossicles. Such small round scutes also covered the throat.

== Discovery and species ==
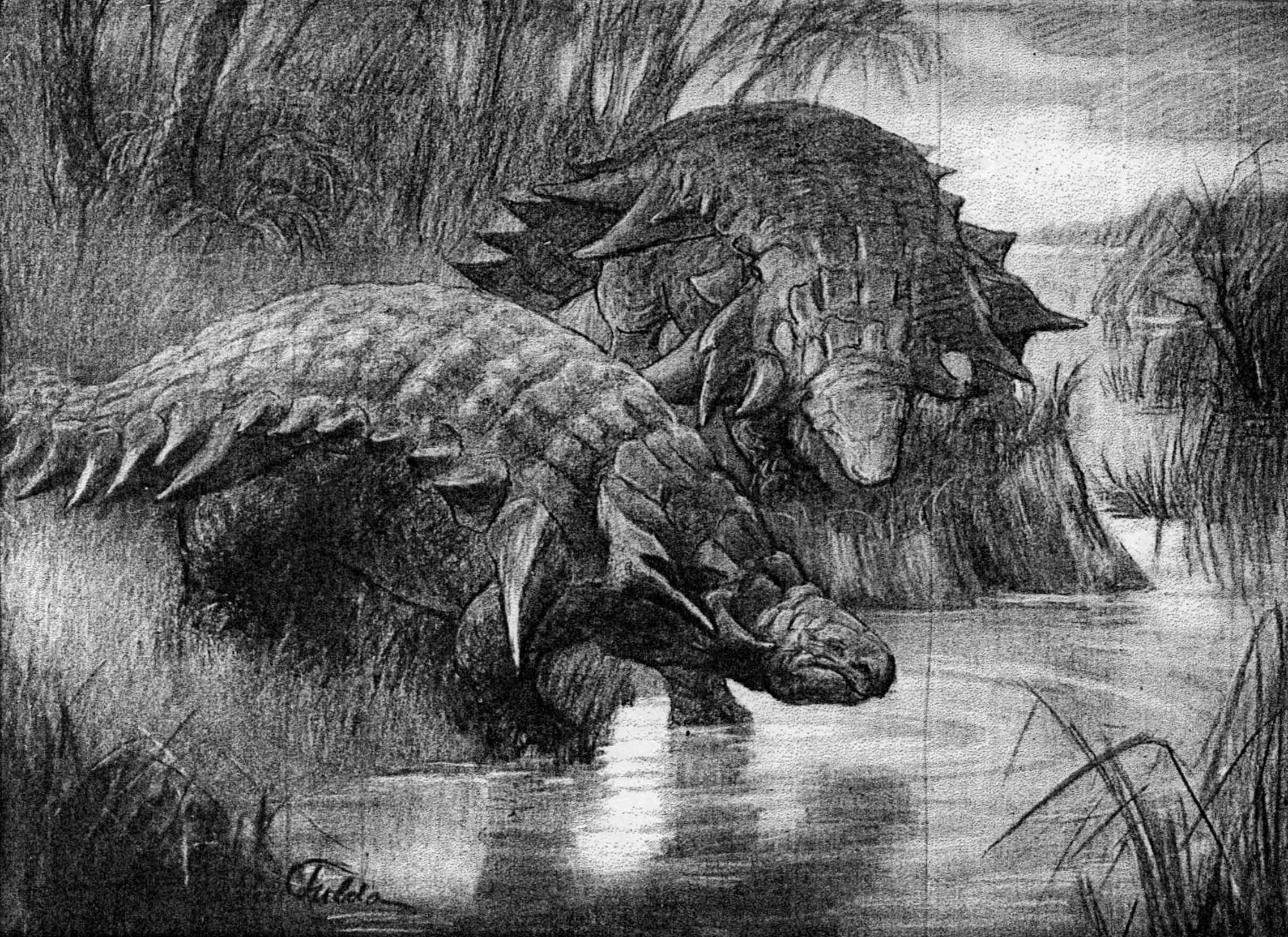
Life restoration of two E. rugosidens from 1922, based on the 1915 AMNH specimen, by Elisabeth Rungius Fulda

In 1915, the American Museum of Natural History obtained the nearly complete, articulated front half of an armoured dinosaur, found the same year by Barnum Brown in Alberta, Canada. In 1922, William Diller Matthew referred this specimen, AMNH 5381, to Palaeoscincus in a popular-science article, not indicating any particular species. It had been intended to name a new Palaeoscincus species in cooperation with Brown but their article was never published. Matthew also referred specimen AMNH 5665, the front of a skeleton found by Levi Sternberg in 1917. In 1930 Charles Whitney Gilmore referred both specimens to Palaeoscincus rugosidens. This species was based on type specimen USNM 11868, a skeleton found by George Fryer Sternberg in June 1928. The specific name is derived from Latin rugosus, "rough", and dens, "tooth". In 1940, Loris Shano Russell referred all three specimens to Edmontonia, as an Edmontonia rugosidens.

Meanwhile, the type species of Edmontonia, Edmontonia longiceps, had been named by Charles Mortram Sternberg in 1928. The generic name Edmontonia refers to Edmonton or the Edmonton Formation. The specific name longiceps means "long-headed" in Latin. Its holotype is specimen NMC 8531, consisting of a skull, right lower jaw and much of the postcranial skeleton, including the armour. It was discovered near Morrin in 1924 by George Paterson, the teamster of the expedition led by C.M. Sternberg.

Edmontonia species include:

- E. longiceps, the type, known from a complete skull, is known from the middle Horseshoe Canyon Formation (Unit 2) which used to be dated to 71.5-71 million years ago. This unit, which straddles the Campanian-Maastrichtian boundary, has since been recalibrated to an age of about 72 million years. Isolated bones and shed teeth from E. longiceps are also known from the upper Judith River Formation in Montana.

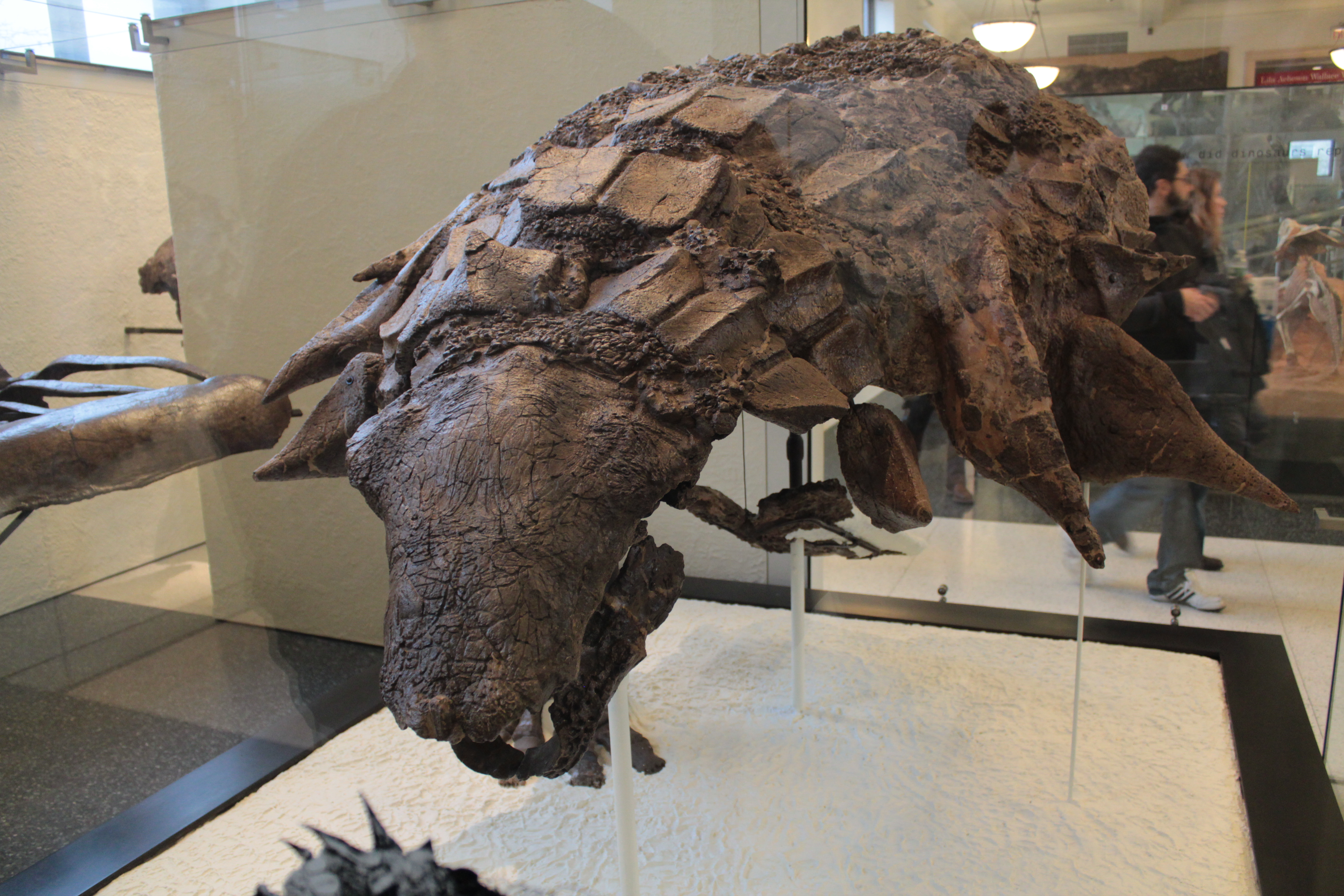
Left side of E. rugosidens specimen AMNH 5665

- E. rugosidens. This species has been given its own genus, Chassternbergia, first coined as a subgenus by Dr. Robert Thomas Bakker in 1988, as Edmontonia (Chassternbergia) rugosidens and is based on differences in skull proportion from E. longiceps and its earlier time period. It was given its full generic name in 1991 by George Olshevsky. The name Chassternbergia honours Charles, "Chas", M. Sternberg. This subgenus or genus name is rarely applied. E. rugosidens is found in the Campanian lower Dinosaur Park Formation, dating from about 76.5-75 million years ago. Many later finds have been referred to E. rugosidens, among them CMN 8879, the top of a skull found in 1937 by Harold D'acre Robinson Lowe; ROM 433, a forked spine found by Jack Horner in 1986 among Oohkotokia material; ROM 5340, paired medial plates; ROM 1215, a skeleton; RTMP 91.36.507, a skull; RTMP 98.74.1, a possible Edmontonia skull; RTMP 98.71.1, a skeleton; RTMP 98.98.01, a skull and right lower jaw; and RTMP 2001.12.158, a skull.

Edmontonia schlessmani was a renaming in 1992 of Denversaurus schlessmani ("Schlessman's Denver lizard") by Adrian Hunt and Spencer Lucas. This taxon was erected by Bakker in 1988 for a skull from the Late Maastrichtian Upper Cretaceous lower Hell Creek Formation of South Dakota, specimen DMNH 468 which was first described as Edmontonia sp. by Carpenter and Breithaupt (1986). This type specimen of Denversaurus is in the collections of the Denver Museum of Natural History (now the Denver Museum of Nature and Science), Denver, Colorado for which the genus was named. The specific name honours Lee E. Schlessman, whose Schlessman Family Foundation sponsored the museum. Bakker described the skull as being much wider at the rear than Edmontonia specimens. However, later workers explained this by its being crushed, and considered the taxon a junior synonym of Edmontonia longiceps. The Black Hills Institute has referred a skeleton (BHI 127327) from the Lance Formation to Denversaurus, referred to as E. schlessmani by Carpenter et al. (2013). Recent phylogenetic analyses included Denversaurus as a valid genus closely related to Edmontonia.

Edmontonia australis was named by Tracy Lee Ford in 2000 on the basis of cervical scutes, the holotype NMMNH P-25063, a pair of medial keeled neck osteoderms from the Maastrichtian Kirtland Formation of New Mexico and the paratype NMMNH P-27450, a right middle neck plate. Although later considered to a dubious name, it is now considered a junior synonym of Glyptodontopelta mimus.

The naming history was further complicated in 1971, when Walter Preston Coombs Jr renamed both Edmontonia species, into Panoplosaurus longiceps and Panoplosaurus rugosidens respectively. The latter species, which due to its much more complete material has determined the image of Edmontonia, until 1940 thus appeared under the name of Palaeoscincus, and during the 1970s and 1980s was shown as "Panoplosaurus" until newer research revived the name Edmontonia.

In 2010, G.S. Paul suggested that E. rugosidens was the direct ancestor of Edmontonia longiceps and the latter was again the direct ancestor of E. schlessmani.

== Phylogeny ==
C.M. Sternberg originally did not provide a classification of Edmontonia. In 1930, L.S. Russell placed the genus in the Nodosauridae, which has been confirmed by subsequent analyses. Edmontonia was generally shown to be a derived nodosaurid, closely related to Panoplosaurus. Russell in 1940 named a separate Edmontoniinae. In 1988 Bakker proposed that the Edmontoniinae with the Panoplosaurinae should be joined into Edmontoniidae, the presumed sister group of the Nodosauridae within Nodosauroidea which he assumed not be ankylosaurians but the last surviving stegosaurians. Exact cladistic analysis has not confirmed these hypotheses however, and the concepts of Edmontoniinae and Edmontoniidae are not in modern use.

Edmontonia has been found as a close relative of Panoplosaurus in phylogenetic analysis, including in the 2018 phylogenetic analysis of Rivera-Sylva and colleagues shown below; limited to the relationships within Panoplosaurini.

- Panoplosaurini
  - Animantarx
  - - Panoplosaurus
    - - Patagopelta
      - Texasetes
      - Denversaurus
      - Edmontonia longiceps
      - Edmontonia rugosidens

== Paleobiology ==
=== Function of the armour ===
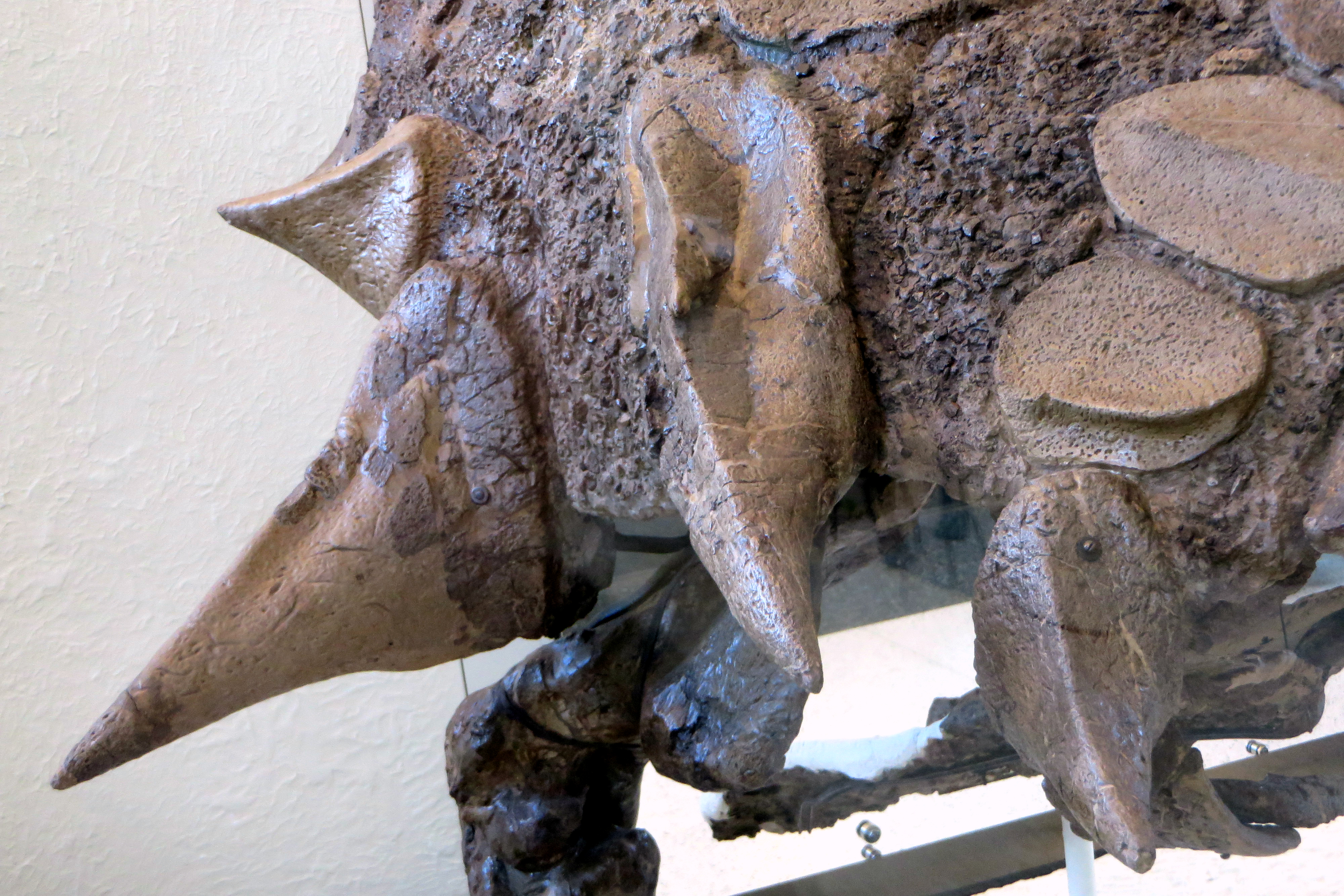
Close up of the shoulder spikes of AMNH 5665

The large spikes were probably used between males in contests of strength to defend territory or gain mates. The spikes would also have been useful for intimidating predators or rival males, passive protection, or for active self-defense. The large forward pointing shoulder spikes could have been used to run through attacking theropods. Carpenter suggested that the larger spikes of AMNH 5665 indicated this was a male specimen, a case of sexual dimorphism. However, he admitted the possibility of ontogeny, older individuals having longer spikes, as the specimen was relatively large. Traditionally it had been assumed that to protect themselves from predators, nodosaurids like Edmontonia might have crouched down on the ground to minimize the possibility of attack to their defenseless underbelly, trying to prevent being flipped over by a predator.

== Paleoecology ==
Rings in the petrified wood of trees contemporary with Edmontonia show evidence of strong seasonal changes in precipitation and temperature; this may hold an explanation for why so many specimens have been found with their armor plating and spikes in the same position they were in life. The Edmontonia could have died due to drought, dried up, and then rapidly became covered in sediment when the rainy season began.

Edmontonia rugosidens existed in the upper section of the Dinosaur Park Formation, about 76.5–75 million years ago. It lived alongside numerous other giant herbivores, such as the hadrosaurids Gryposaurus, Corythosaurus and Parasaurolophus, the ceratopsids Centrosaurus and Chasmosaurus, and ankylosaurids Scolosaurus and Dyoplosaurus Studies of the jaw anatomy and mechanics of these dinosaurs suggests they probably all occupied slightly different ecological niches in order to avoid direct competition for food in such a crowded eco-space. The only large predators known from the same levels of the formation as Edmontonia are the tyrannosaurids Gorgosaurus libratus and an unnamed species of Daspletosaurus.

Edmontonia longiceps is known from the Horseshoe Canyon Formation, from the middle unit, which was dated to 71.5-71 million years ago in 2009. The fauna of the Horseshoe Canyon Formation is well-known, as vertebrate fossils, including those of dinosaurs, are quite common. Sharks, rays, sturgeons, bowfins, gars and the gar-like Aspidorhynchus made up the fish fauna. The saltwater plesiosaur Leurospondylus has been found in marine sediments in the Horseshoe Canyon, while freshwater environments were populated by turtles, Champsosaurus, and crocodilians like Leidyosuchus and Stangerochampsa. Dinosaurs dominate the fauna, especially hadrosaurs, which make up half of all dinosaurs known, including the genera Edmontosaurus, Saurolophus and Hypacrosaurus. Ceratopsians and ornithomimids were also very common, together making up another third of the known fauna. Along with much rarer ankylosaurians and pachycephalosaurs, all of these animals would have been prey for a diverse array of carnivorous theropods, including troodontids, dromaeosaurids, and caenagnathids. Adult Albertosaurus was the apex predator in this environment, with intermediate niches possibly filled by juvenile albertosaurs.

== See also ==
- Timeline of ankylosaur research
