= Grass spider =

Grass spider may refer to:

- genus Agelena, the Eurasian grass spiders
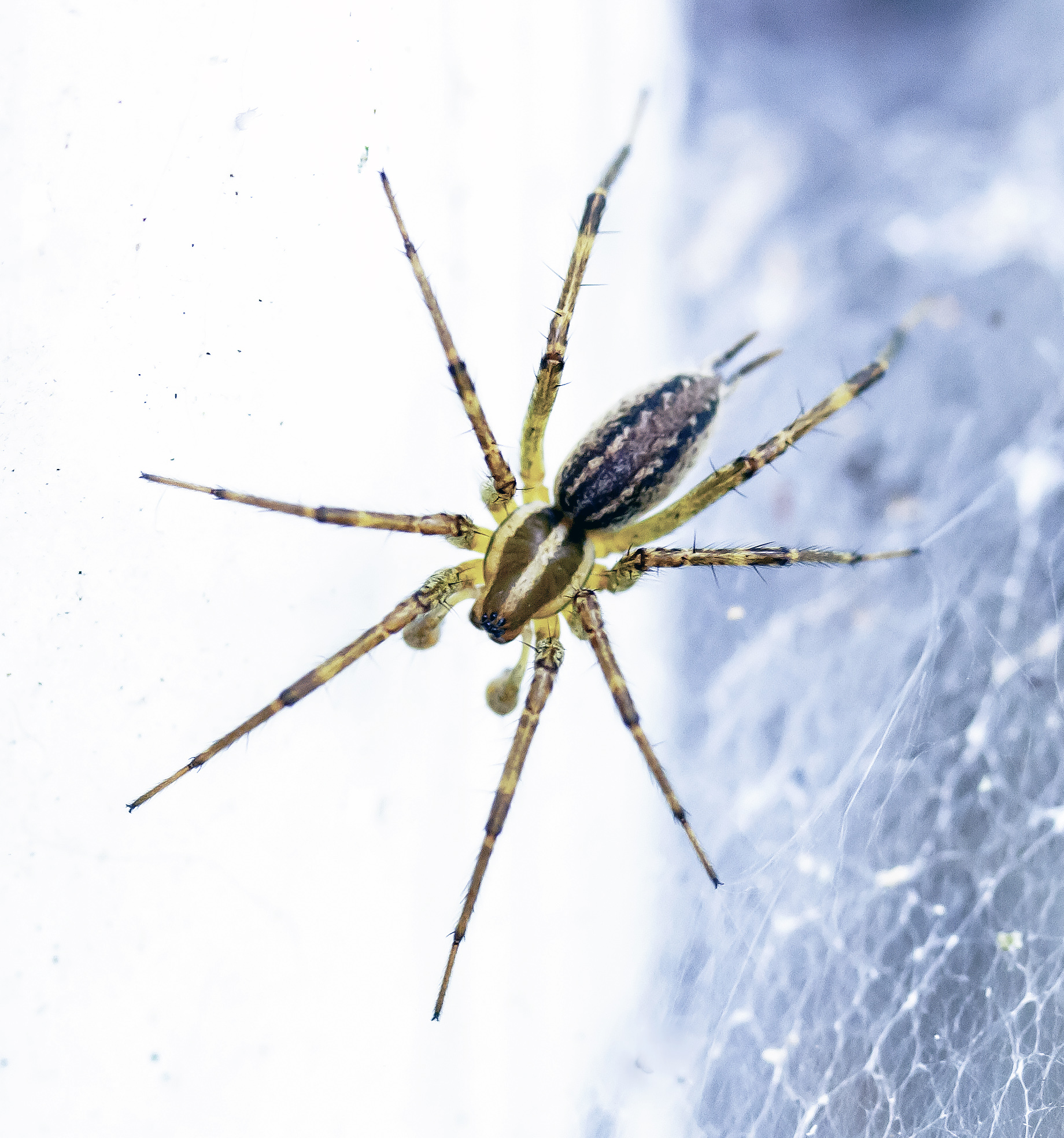
- American Grass Spider (Genus Agelenopsis)
  genus Agelenopsis, the American grass spiders

== See also ==
- genus Oxytate, the (green) grass crab spiders
- genus Runcinia, the (brown) grass crab spiders
- species Argiope catenulata, the grass cross spider
- species Florinda coccinea, the red grass spider
