= Elisabeth Rungius Fulda =

German-American paleoartist (1879 – 1968)

- Born: 1879; Germany
- Died: January 23, 1968 (aged 88–89); New York City
- Occupation: paleoartist

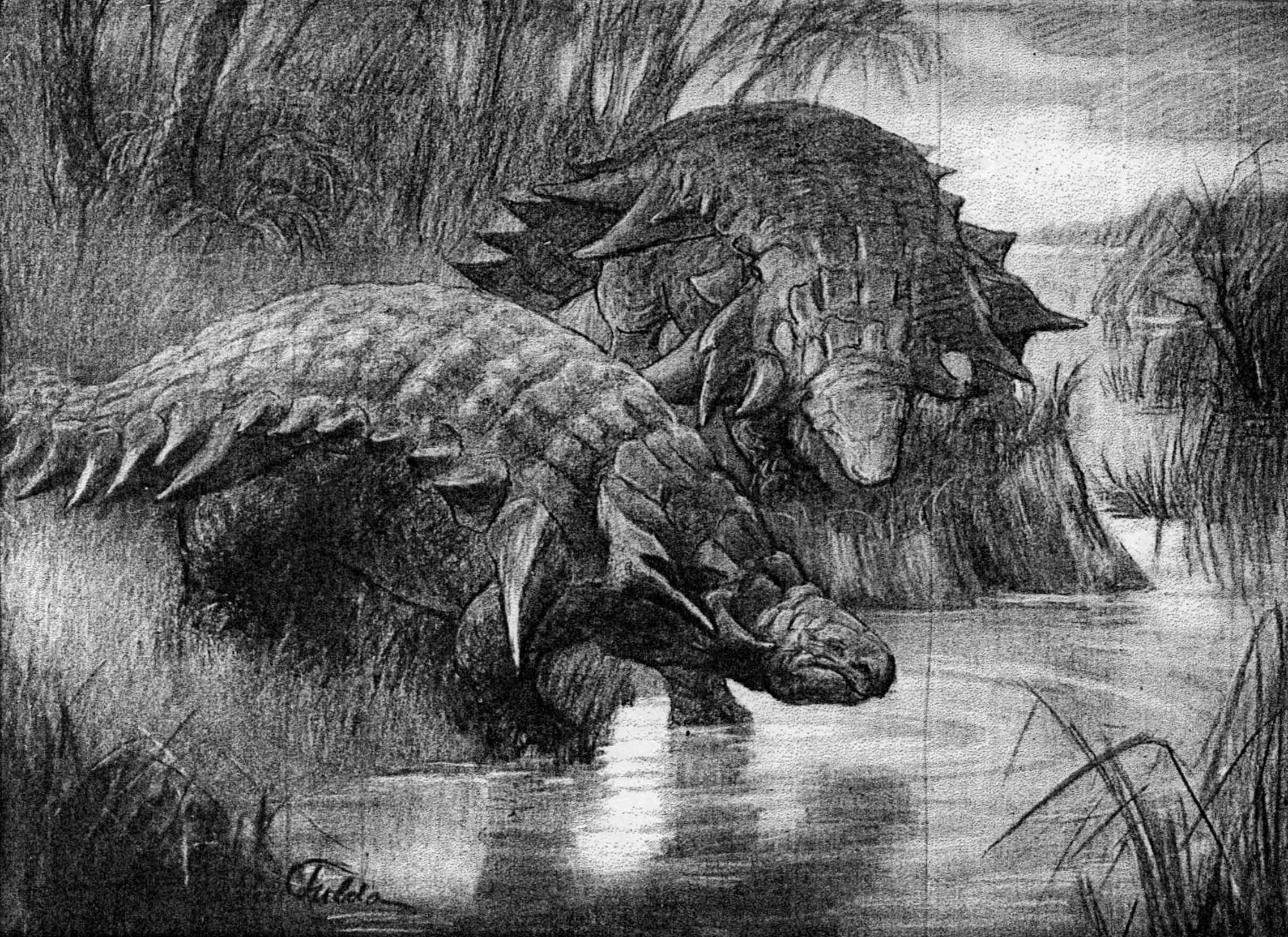
Edmontonia restoration

Elisabeth Rungius Fulda (1879 – 1968) was a German-American paleoartist.

Fulda was born near Berlin, Germany, in 1879. She was the sister of the wildlife illustrator Carl Rungius. She emigrated to the United States in 1905 and studied at Cooper Union and the Art Students League of New York.

She worked creating illustrations and models for the American Museum of Natural History. She also created illustrations for the Index of American Design. These illustrations are part of the collection of the National Gallery of Art.

Fulda was a member of the National Association of Women Artists. She was a founding member of the Society of Animal Artists, where she served as the first president in 1960.

Fulda died on January 23, 1968 in New York City.
