= Ellen McCaleb =

American artist

Ellen McCaleb is an American fish carver and painter who recreates trophy fish decoys off of client photographs and measurements. Her work follows the wood carving traditions established in Europe during the 19th century.

== Early life and education ==
McCaleb was born in Virginia and grew up doing activities that are common among people on the shore like fishing, crabbing, and clamming. McCaleb studied art and architecture at the University of Pennsylvania.

== Work ==
McCaleb works out of a farmhouse in New Hampshire using a band saw, two-handled drawknife, and two-handled spokeshave to shape the fish, before filing, sanding, and rasping them. A five-layer paint takes six weeks, and there is a 12-month order backlog for the sculptures that start at $110 per inch and were described in Forbes as being so beautiful "that your descendants will be gaffing one another to inherit them."
