= Ducks Unlimited =

American conservation organization

- Founded: 1937
- Founder: Joseph Knapp
- Type: Nonprofit organization
- Purpose: Waterfowl habitat conservation
- Headquarters: Memphis, Tennessee, US
- Region served: North America
- Members: 700,000
- Key people: Chuck Smith, President; Adam Putnam, CEO
- Volunteers: 40,000
- Website: ducks.org

Ducks Unlimited (DU) is an American 501(c)(3) nonprofit organization dedicated to the conservation of wetlands and associated upland habitats for waterfowl, other wildlife, and people.

== History and profile ==
In 1927, an offshoot of the Boone and Crockett Club was created specifically for sport bird management and operated until 1930 as the American Wild Fowlers. Membership included such people as Arthur Bartley and Nash Buckingham, who would later be involved in the conservation movement. In 1930, Joseph P. Knapp, a publishing tycoon who successfully obtained such notable publications as The Associated Sunday Magazine, Crowell Publishing Company, Collier’s Weekly, Farm and Fireside, and the book publisher P.F. Collier & Sons, founded More Game Birds in America and American Wild Fowlers was quickly absorbed into the new organization.

In 1937, Knapp, Robert Winthrop, E.H.Low and a small group of conservation philanthropists decided to focus on the decreasing waterfowl populations, and the habitat necessary to sustain them in Canada. Ducks Unlimited was incorporated on January 29, 1937. Local Winnipeg artist Ernie Wilson created the original Ducks Unlimited logo. More Game Birds in America was then absorbed by the new waterfowl organization.

Ducks Unlimited Canada was incorporated in Winnipeg, Manitoba, on March 10, 1937. As of 2020, Ducks Unlimited Canada has a conservation community of 111,025 people.

Ducks Unlimited also works in Mexico through their sister organization, Ducks Unlimited de Mexico. Other chapters have since begun operation in Latin America, Mexico, New Zealand, and Australia.

Ducks Unlimited has conserved at least 15 million acres of waterfowl habitat in North America. DU partners with a wide range of corporations, governments, other non-governmental organizations, landowners, and private citizens to restore and manage areas that have been degraded and to prevent further degradation of existing wetlands. DU is also active in working with others to recommend government policies that will influence wetlands and the environment. DU generated more than $201 million in revenues during their 2019 fiscal year; a minimum of 80 percent of that revenue goes directly toward habitat conservation. Their sources of revenue include federal and state habitat reimbursements, conservation easements, sponsors, members, major gifts, donations, royalties, and advertisement.

The majority of DU's financial contributors and 90 percent of its members are hunters. Its DU Magazine contains many historical and practical articles on waterfowl hunting. It obtains revenue from advertisements of waterfowling equipment such as shotguns, ammunition, decoys, and bird calls. Additional revenue is raised by commissioning artists to create duck artwork, with a portion going to the artist and the majority share of revenue going to Ducks Unlimited. Eric Thorsen is one wildlife artist who has contributed artwork for fundraising. In 2019, Ducks Unlimited Canada and the University of Saskatchewan partnered to establish the "Ducks Unlimited Canada Endowed Chair in Wetland and Waterfowl Conservation". The position will aid the university faculty and students with environmental education, research, and outreach.

In March 2019, Ducks Unlimited named former Florida Agriculture Commissioner Adam Putnam the new Chief Executive Officer.

== Conservation ==
Traditionally, most Ducks Unlimited wetland conservation projects were conducted on waterfowl breeding areas in the Canadian prairies by its sister organization, Ducks Unlimited Canada (DUC). DUC has since expanded its operations to include projects in every Canadian province and territory, not just in the prairies. Ducks Unlimited has also expanded its operations to include conservation projects in every state of the United States and Mexico. It retains a primary focus on habitats most important to waterfowl, including the restoration of duck breeding habitats in Canada and the northern central states and ducks overwintering habitat, mainly in the coastal and southern states and in Mexico.

=== Coastal cleanup ===
Following the 2010 Deepwater Horizon oil spill in the Gulf of Mexico, Ducks Unlimited became involved with multiple clean-up efforts in Gulf states. The organization worked with the National Fish and Wildlife Foundation and the USDA Natural Resources Conservation Service to protect approximately 79,000 acres of waterfowl and other waterbird habitats. In 2015, Ducks Unlimited partnered with The Trust for Public Land to build an online database that tracked conservation and cleanup efforts following the Deepwater Horizon spill. On August 16, 2018, the National Oceanic and Atmospheric Administration (NOAA) announced a $1.8 million cooperative agreement with Ducks Unlimited to clean up oil spills and hazardous waste in the State of Texas from releases originating from the Gulf of Mexico.

=== Regions of special interest ===
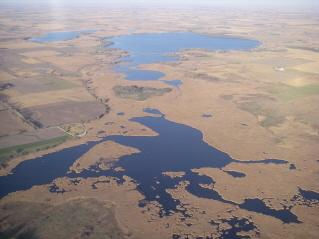
Barringer Slough in Iowa, a remnant of the extensive prairie wetlands that once covered the region

- Prairie Pothole Region
- Western Boreal Forest of Canada
- Mississippi Alluvial Valley
- Central Valley and Coastal California
- Gulf Coastal Prairie

== Ducks Unlimited TV ==
Ducks Unlimited produces a television show, Ducks Unlimited TV a.k.a. DUTV. This show is hosted by Field Hudnall, Wade Bourne, and Ainsley Beeman. The show highlights conservation and waterfowl hunting across the United States.

== See also ==
- Al Agnew
- Mississippi Flyway
- Weed Lake
