= East Gros Ventre Butte =

Butte in Jackson, Wyoming, US

- Location within Wyoming

Highest point
- Elevation: 7,411 ft (2,259 m)
- Coordinates: 43°29′04.8″N 110°46′46.6″W

Geography
- Location: Teton County, Wyoming

East Gros Ventre Butte is a butte located northwest of Jackson, Wyoming. It is sometimes referred to as "Saddle Butte" by long-time residents of Jackson Hole.
