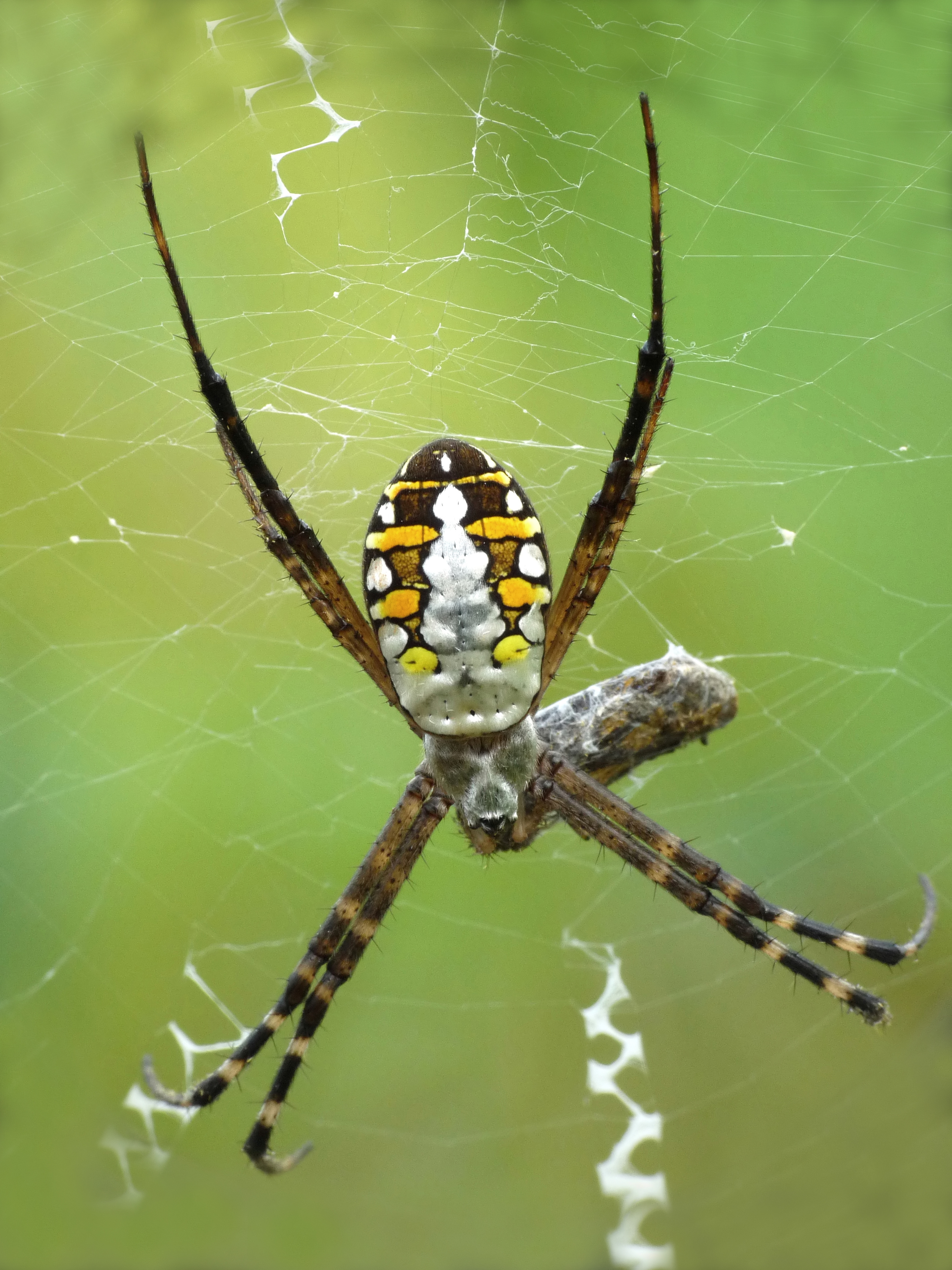
- Argiope catenulata in Rangareddy district of Andhra Pradesh, India.

Scientific classification
- Domain: Eukaryota
- Kingdom: Animalia
- Phylum: Arthropoda
- Subphylum: Chelicerata
- Class: Arachnida
- Order: Araneae
- Infraorder: Araneomorphae
- Family: Araneidae
- Genus: Argiope
- Species: A. catenulata

Binomial name
- Argiope catenulata (Doleschall, 1859)

Synonyms
- Epeira catenulata Doleschall, 1859

= Argiope catenulata =

Species of spider

Argiope catenulata, also known as the grass cross spider, is a species of orb-weaver spider (family Araneidae) ranging from India to the Philippines and Papua New Guinea, and also found in Australia in 2019. Like other species of the same genus, it builds a web with a zig-zag stabilimentum.

== Description ==
Argiope catenulata is a colorful spider. The female's cephalothorax is yellow with black eye margins. Its abdomen is oblong with a black and silvery-whitish yellow dorsal pattern. Brown patches of irregular shapes are present from the median of the opisthosoma (abdomen) to the posterior side. The legs are black with thin white rings.

The male is smaller than the female. It has a brownish red to yellowish brown cephalothorax with black eye margins. Its abdomen is yellowish with a dorsal pattern as in the female. The legs are yellowish brown.

== Ecology ==
Argiope catenulata are web builders, the circular webs have zigzag webbing known as white stabilimenta making them sticky. They are common in all rice environments. They are late colonizers of rice fields and are found with their heads hanging down in their webs.

The female spider lays between 600 and 800 eggs in her life span of 2 to 3 months. The eggs of A. catenulata are contained in a light brown cocoon which hangs on the web.

== Gallery ==
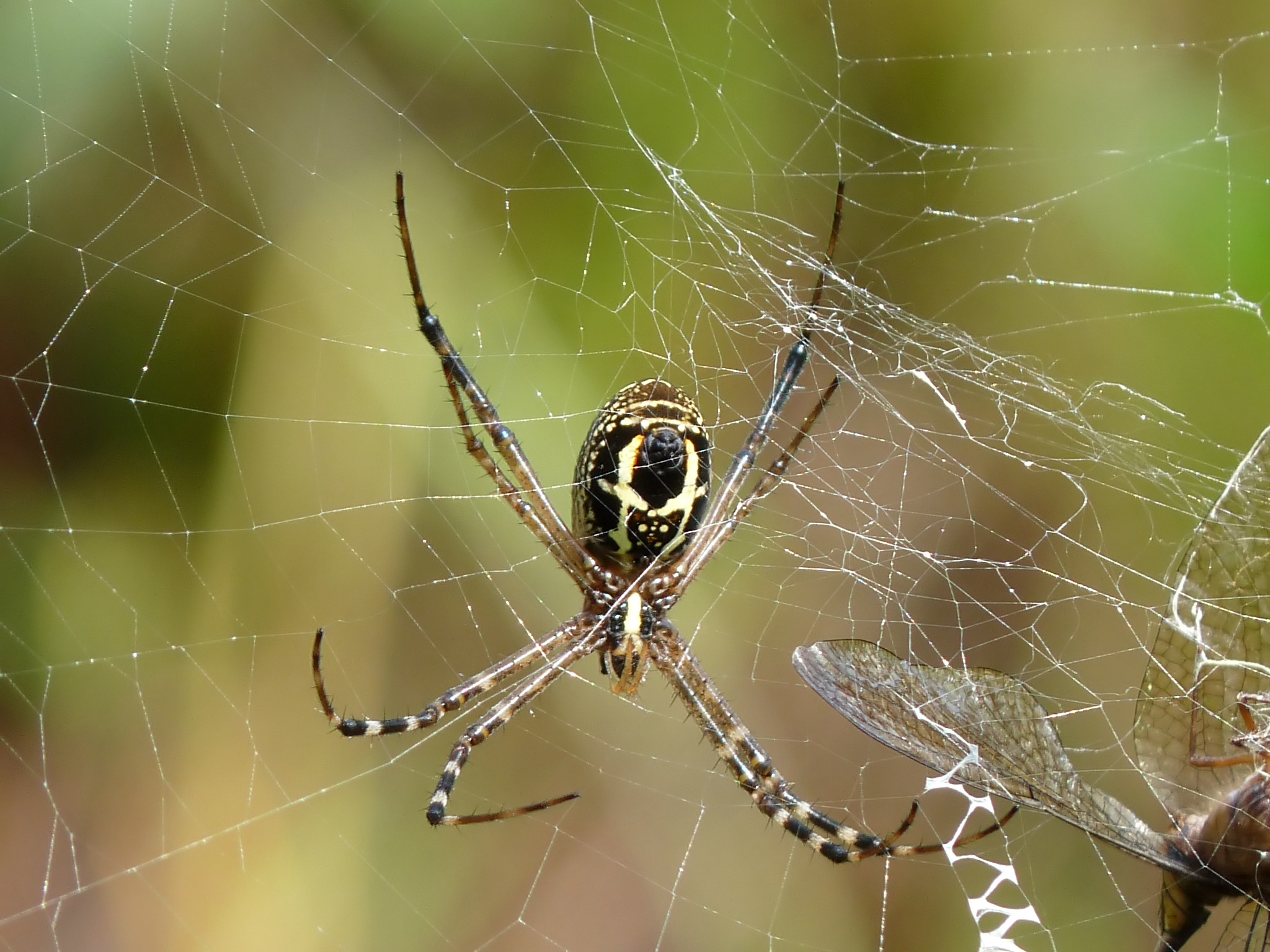
Argiope catenulata, underside

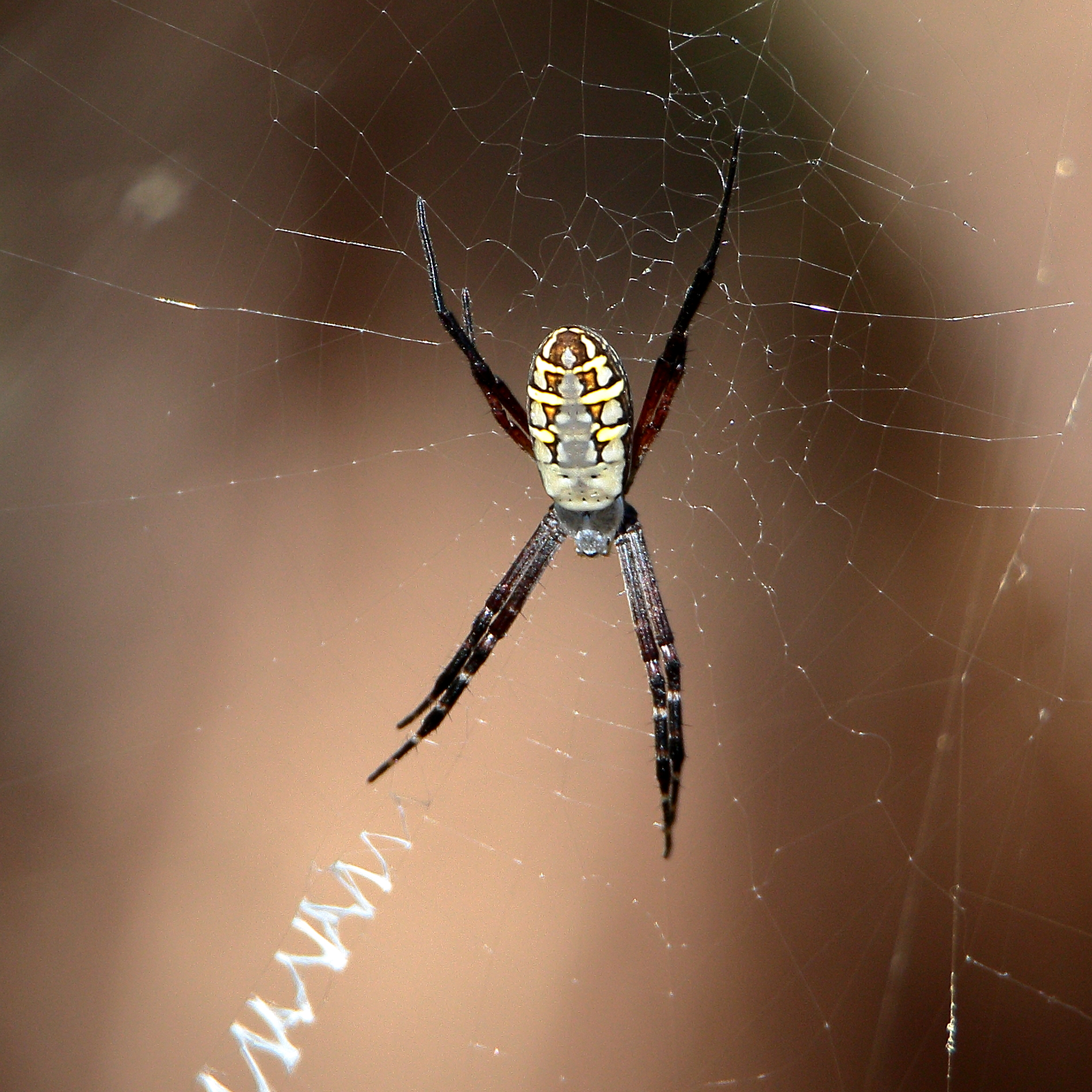
Northern Territory, Australia

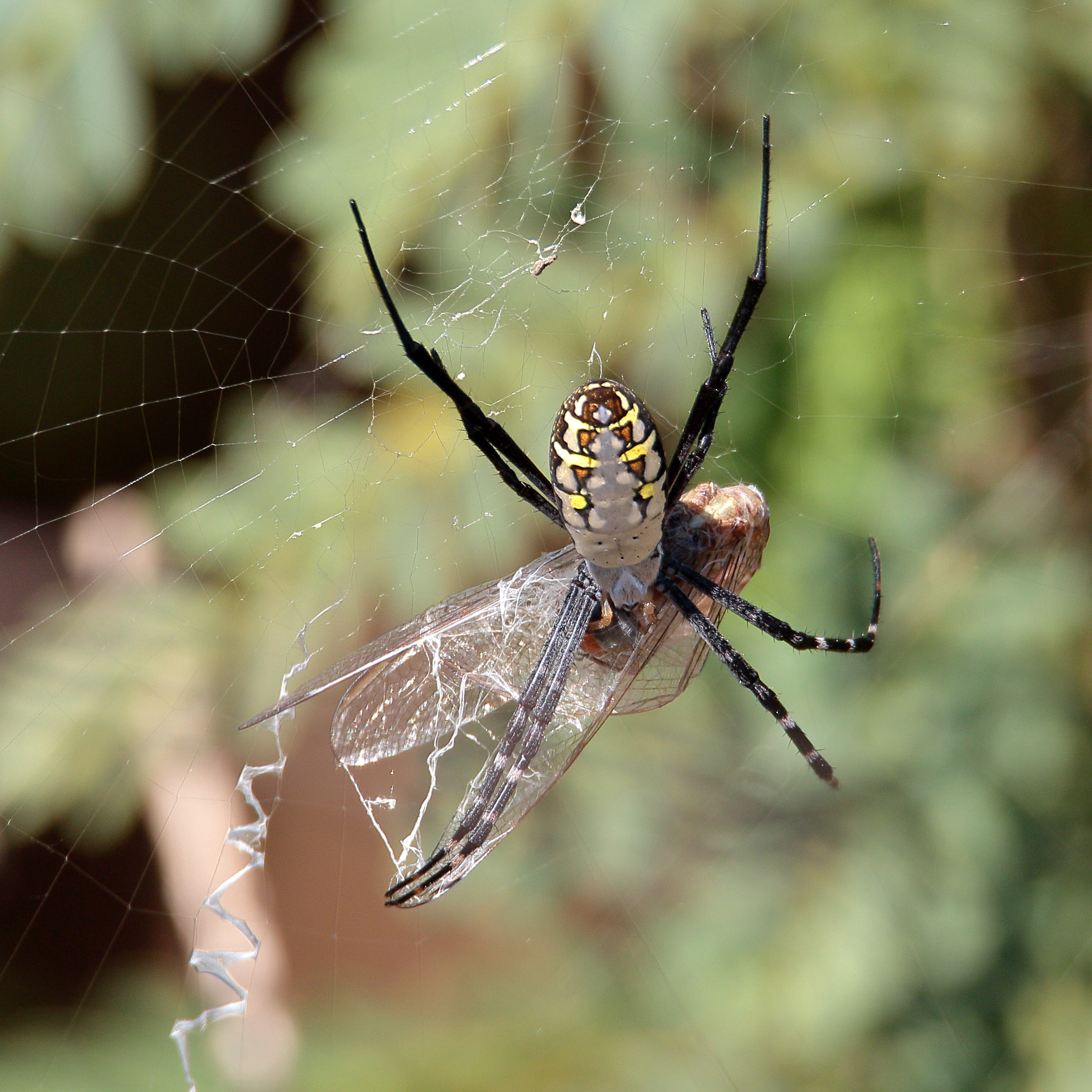
Northern Territory, Australia

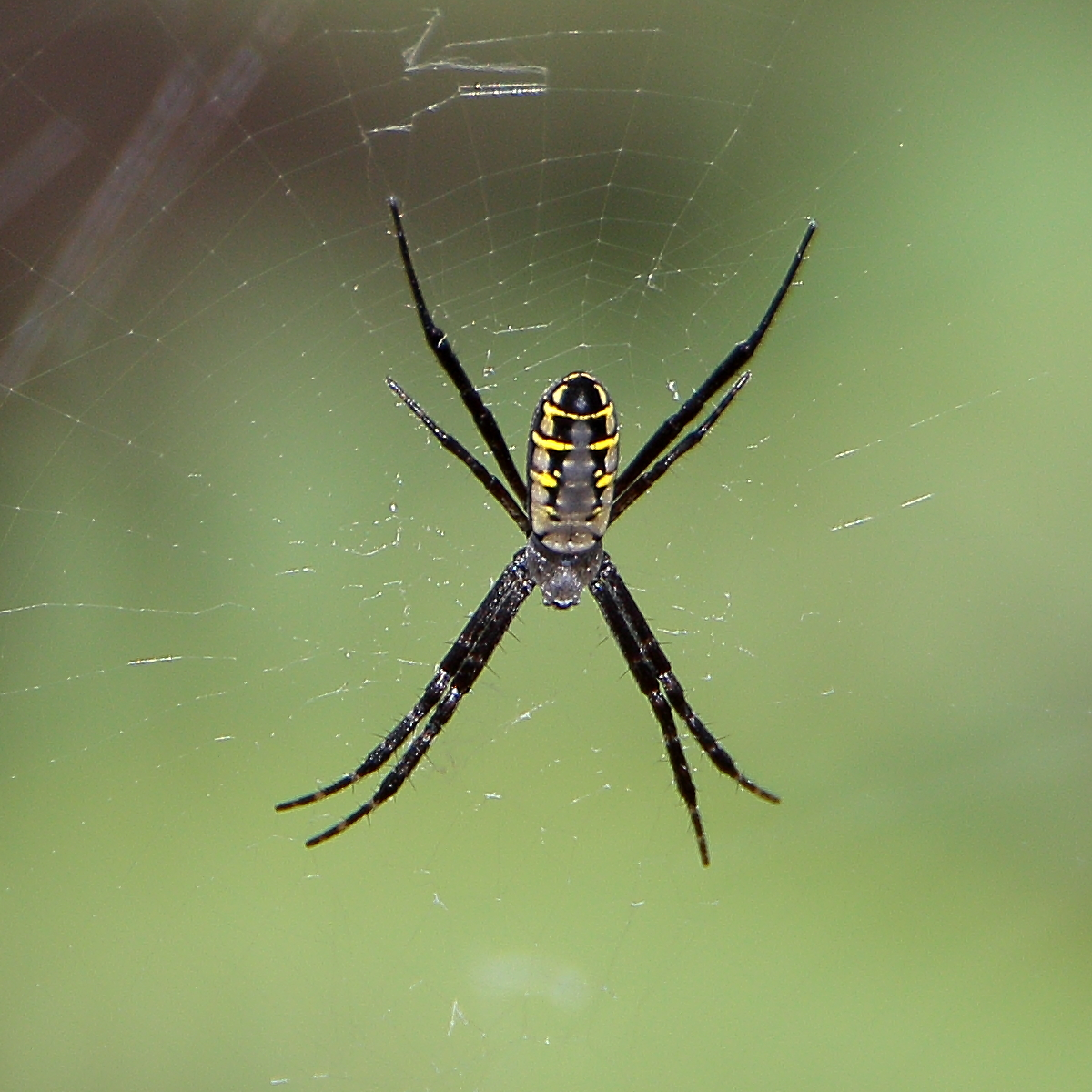
Northern Territory, Australia
