= Fish carving =

Fish sculpture, fish decoys, fish carvings and fish trophies are the names given to a style of painted wood carving practiced by various artisans. The works are kept as decorations and collectible as folk art.

British fish carvers include John B. Russell (Scottish), John and Dhuie Tully, P.B. Malloch and the Hardy Brothers. Artists Ellen McCaleb & Eric L Knowlton work in the United States. Styles of carving can range from simple folk art, miniature decoys, 'European' style carvings (side profile of fish usually displayed on a wood panel) and highly detailed lifesized and ultra realism. For realism, some paint on scale patterns, others carve in the scale details but most of the World Championship realistic carvings feature scales burned in with a wood-burning pen, one at a time, often with scale designs created just for that specific fish. Example from artist Eric L Knowlton of Reel Trout Studio, Alaska, shown here:

The Gathering (show) bills itself as the world's largest wooden-carved fish decoy show and is held annually in Perham, Minnesota. It will be in its 13th year in 2010.

== See also ==
- Trophy hunting
- Taxidermy
- Duck decoy (model)
- Big Mouth Billy Bass
