= Society of Animal Artists =

International organization for artists

The Society of Animal Artists is an international organization for artists who paint, sculpt, or draw animals and wildlife, founded in 1960.

The Society holds an annual exhibition, "Art & the Animal", which premieres at museum venues. A portion of the exhibition is shown on tour around the United States. Dr. David J. Wagner is the current Tour Director and Curator for the Society of Animal Artists. The Society celebrated its 50th anniversary in 2010 with their exhibition at the San Diego Natural History Museum in San Diego, CA.

== Introduction ==
The Society of Animal Artists has an historical affinity with organizations that grew out of a movement to form associations and clubs dedicated to art in the 19th century. Like the National Academy of Design and other such organizations, the Society of Animal Artists is mandated by its bylaws to organize annual exhibitions. It is also worth noting that the Society of Animal Artists was founded in response to a 1958 exhibition entitled Animals in Bronx Zoo, held at Burr Galleries in New York, because this established an historical affinity with the conservation movement, which various members have supported ever since, not only through the ecological message of their artwork but also through generous contributions and sales.

== History ==
=== Founding and early years ===
In the 1950s, individuals from the New York metropolitan area who liked to meet and paint at the Bronx Zoo together staged "Animals In Bronx Zoo" at the Burr Gallery sponsored by the New York Zoological Society. Patricia Allen Bott and Guido Borghi were inspired to form the organization after an enthusiastic reception to this exhibition. The fledgling Society soon became a member of the renowned Salmagundi Club, and established an office in their building at 47 Fifth Avenue, New York, NY. Early Exhibitions were held in various galleries such as Sportsman’s Edge, Grand Central Art Galleries and the Alder Gallery (All in New York City). In addition to Bott and Borghi, early members included: Elisabeth Rungius Fulda [sister of Carl Rungius], Paul Bransom, John Clymer, Gifford Cochran, Brenda Frey, Anna Hyatt Huntington, Gertude K. Lathrop, Robert Lougheed, Ugo Mochi, Clement Weisbecker and Walter Wilwerding.

=== Catalogs and exhibitions ===
The first SAA catalog, produced in 1978 for the exhibition at Sportsman’s Edge Gallery, consisted of 8 pages and was black and white. In 1979, the SAA had its first actual Annual Exhibition opening (again at Sportsman’s Edge), with formal programs and events. A 20-page black and white catalog was produced. In 1980, the "Society of Animal Artists Exhibition/Convention" was hosted by Game Conservation International at the Four Seasons Plaza Nacional Hotel, San Antonio, Texas. A 28-page, black and white catalog was produced. The first four-color catalog (44 pages) was produced in 1990, for the 30th Annual Exhibition at St. Hubert’s Giralda, New Jersey.

The SAA has hosted annual exhibitions since 1960 with the exhibition first being named "Art and the Animal" in 1988. The first museum venue was the Academy of Sciences in Philadelphia in 1981. In 1988 the Society recruited David J. Wagner to create and manage tours of artworks selected from annual exhibitions and to secure hosts for its annual exhibitions. SAA exhibitions have been displayed throughout the United States, with approximately 70% of hosting venues having been art museums or general museums that have included art as an integral dimension of their core mission. Over the years, the SAA’s work has been on display at more than 100 different institutions across the United States—and once in Canada in 1995 at the Old Algonquin Museum, Algonquin Park, Ontario.

== See also ==
- Wildlife art
- List of wildlife artists
