= The Edge of the Sea =

1955 book by Rachel Carson

- Book cover of The Edge of the Sea
- Author: Rachel Carson
- Illustrator: Robert W. Hines
- Language: English
- Series: Sea trilogy
- Subject: Marine biology and history
- Genre: Nature writing
- Publisher: Houghton Mifflin
- Publication date: 1955
- Publication place: United States
- Media type: Print
- Pages: 304
- ISBN: 9780395075050
- Preceded by: The Sea Around Us

The Edge of the Sea is a best-selling book by the American marine biologist Rachel Carson, first published as a whole by Houghton Mifflin in 1955. The third and final volume of her sea trilogy, The Edge of the Sea, is a scientifically accurate exploration of the ecology of the Eastern Seaboard.

== Description ==
The Edge of the Sea was a passion project for Carson. While working for the United States Fish and Wildlife Service, she had the idea of creating a field guide of the Atlantic seashore. The editor-in-chief of Houghton Mifflin, Paul Brooks, had a similar idea following the literary fame achieved by The Sea Around Us, and The Edge of the Sea was released on October 26, 1955.

A scientifically accurate exploration of the ecology of Atlantic seashore, The Edge of the Sea is an account of what one could find at the literal edge of the sea. Within The Edge of the Sea, Carson details her explorations with accounts of a tide pool, an inaccessible cave, and the instance of a lone crab on the shore at midnight. Each is a memorable encounter and works to explore life on the edge of the sea.

Aided by a Guggenheim Fellowship, Carson's research leading up to The Edge of the Sea was produced by the exploration of the rocky coast of New England, the sandy shores of the Mid-Atlantic, and the coral shores of the Southern Atlantic. Each area is described by Carson with immense detail, working to provide people with a glimpse of nature at its core.

The Edge of the Sea was Carson's first collaboration with Bob Hines, an American wildlife artist for the US Fish and Wildlife Service, whose drawings accompany Carson's writing.

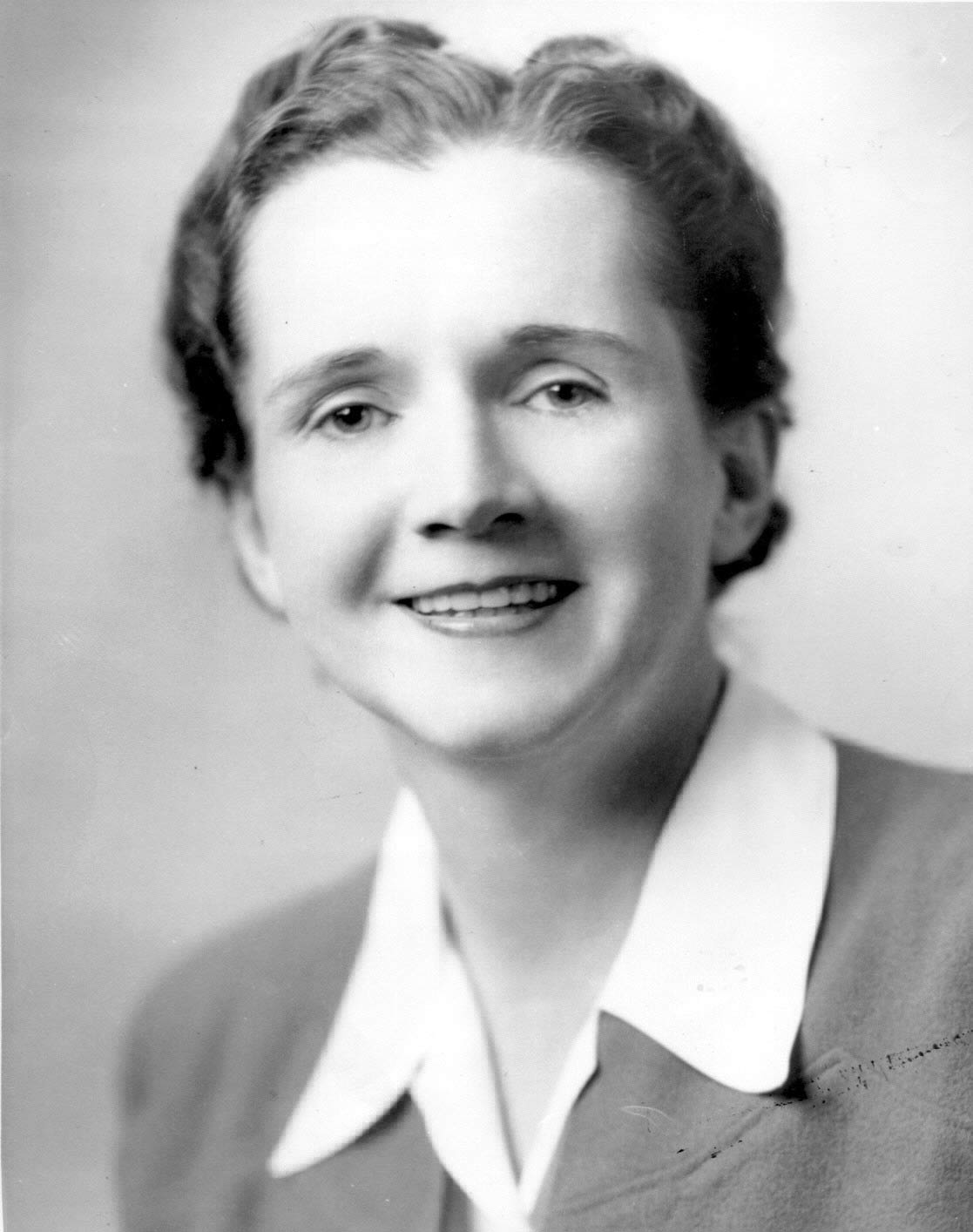
Rachel Carson. Official photo as a USFWS employee. c. 1940.

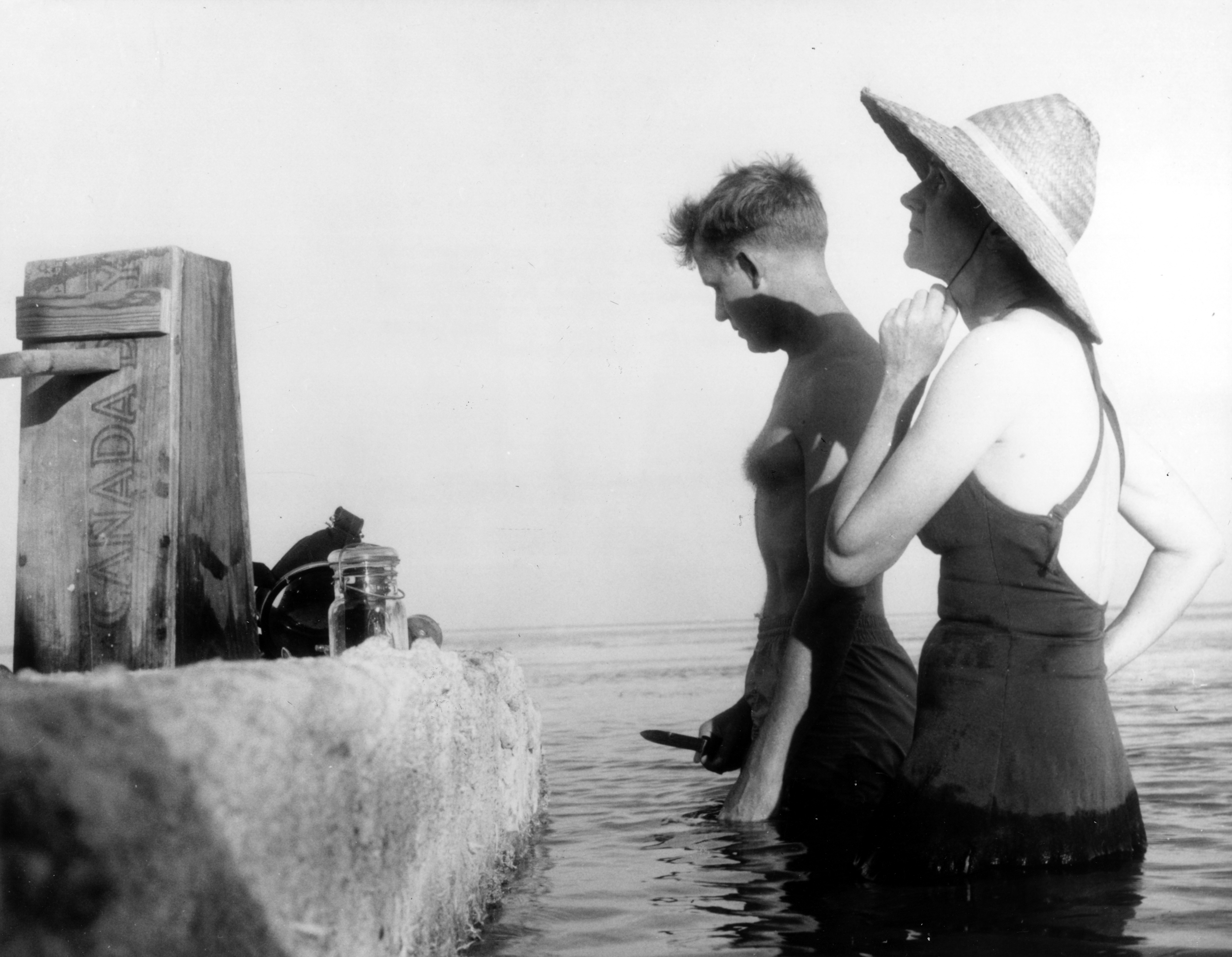
Bob Hines and Rachel Carson on the Atlantic coast.

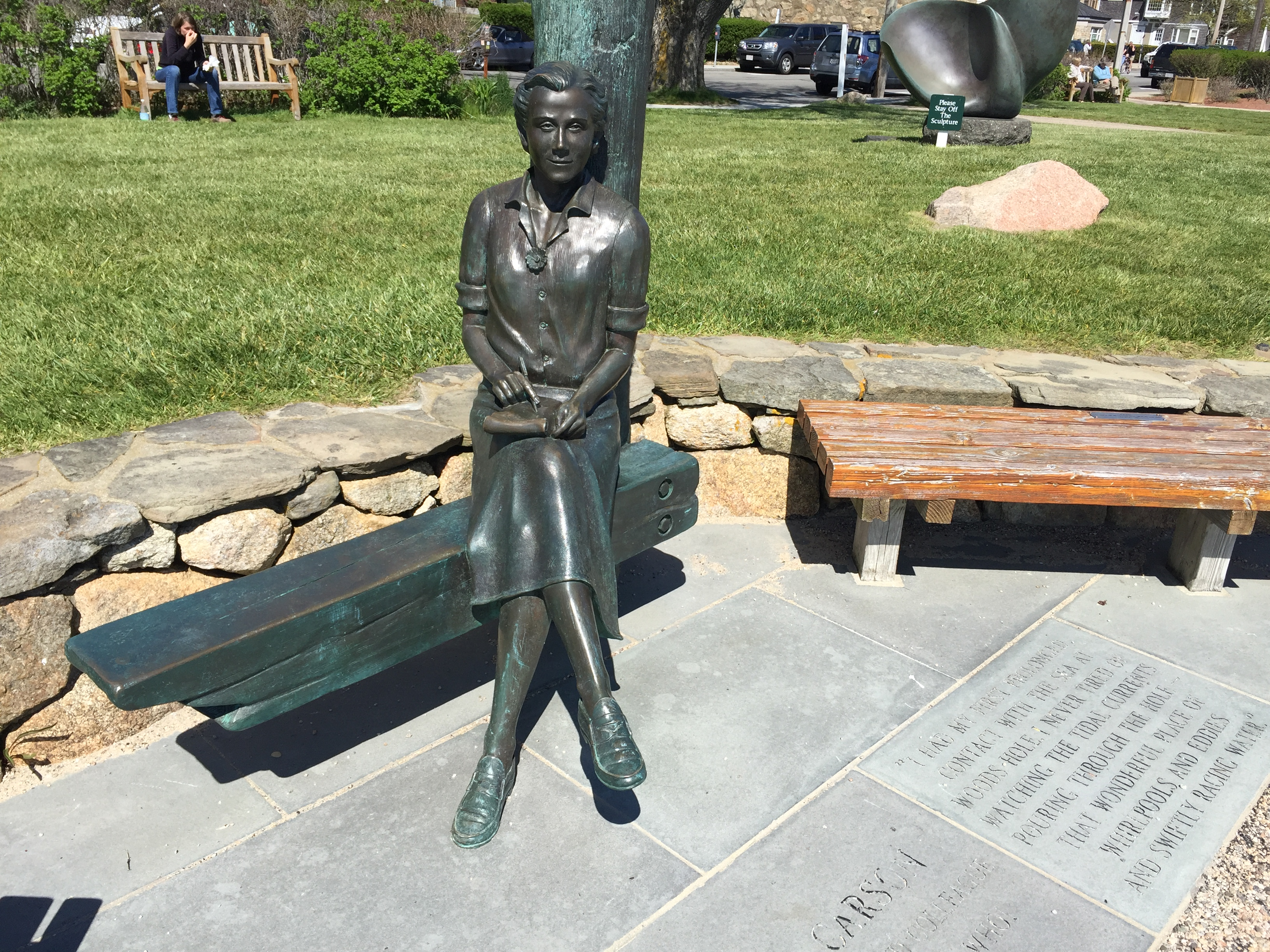
A statue of a young Rachel Carson in Woods Hole, Massachusetts.
