= Eric Turkington =

American politician

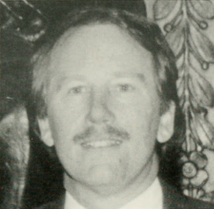
- Portrait of Eric Turkington

Member of the Massachusetts House of Representatives from the Barnstable, Dukes and Nantucket district
- In office January 4, 1989 – January 7, 2009
- Preceded by: Howard C. Cahoon, Jr. (Cape & Islands district)
- Succeeded by: Timothy Madden

Personal details
- Born: Eric Thornton Turkington; August 12, 1947 (age 78) Gouverneur, New York, U.S.
- Party: Democratic
- Spouse: Nancy
- Children: 2
- Education: University of Pennsylvania (BA); Boston College (JD)

Eric Thornton Turkington (born August 12, 1947) is an American lawyer and politician. He is a former Democratic member of the Massachusetts House of Representatives, who represented the Barnstable, Dukes and Nantucket District from 1989 to 2009.

== Career ==
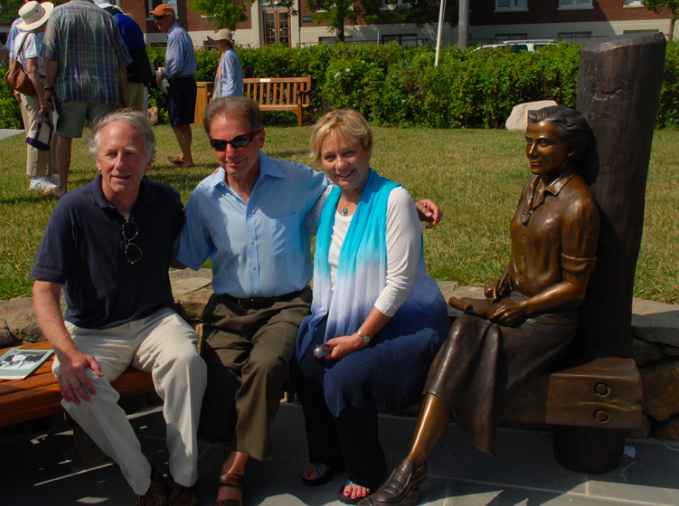
Eric Turkington (left) with former MBL President and Director Gary Borisy and WHOI President and Director Susan Avery at the dedication of the statue of Rachel Carson.

On November 7, 2006, he won his race against Republican Jim Powell in the 2006 elections. He did not run for reelection in 2008, instead running for Barnstable Register of Probate. He served as a co-chair of the Rachel Carson sculpture committee.

== Personal life ==
He is married to his wife Nancy and they have two children. They live in Falmouth, Massachusetts.
