= Linda Lear =

American historian of science and biographer

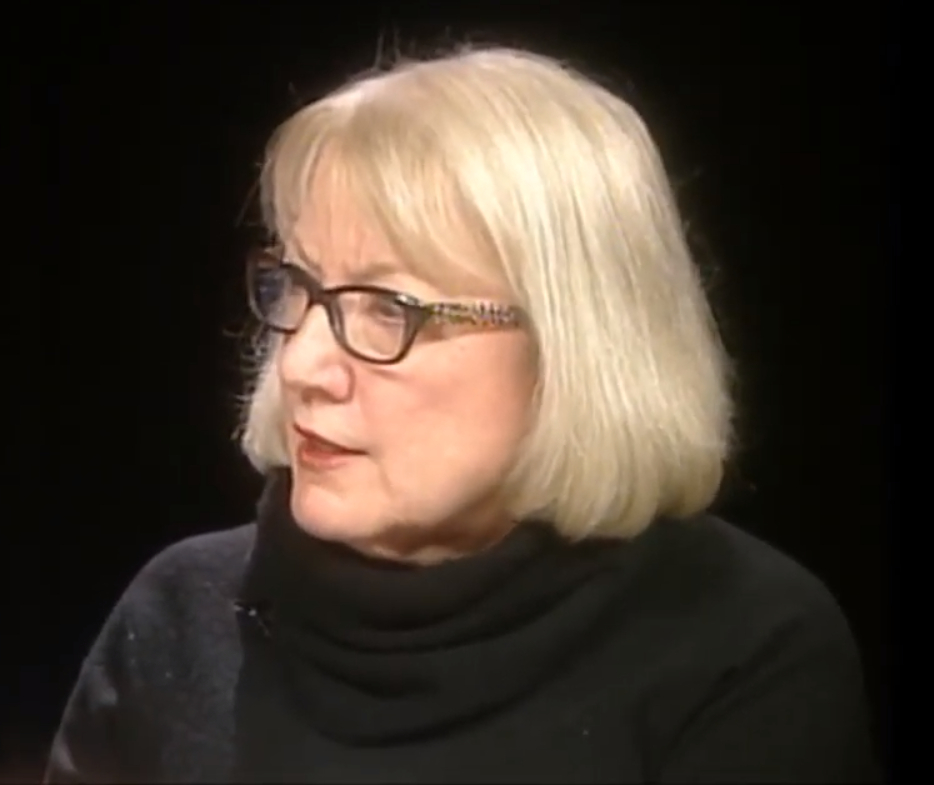
Linda Lear

Linda Jane Lear (born February 16, 1940) is an American historian of science and biographer.

== Life and career ==
A native of Pittsburgh, Lear received her A.B. from Connecticut College in 1962, following with an A.M. from Columbia University in 1964; she received a Ph.D. in history from George Washington University in 1974. From 1963 until 1965 she chaired the history department of the Vail Deane School, and from 1965 until 1968 held a similar position at the National Cathedral School. An assistant professor at New Mexico State University from 1974 until 1976, she next worked at the American Association of Retired Persons, remaining there until 1978. In that year she joined the faculty of the George Washington University, where she has since served as assistant director of experimental programs and associated professor. She has also worked for the United States Senate, and held a position on the board of directors of Connecticut College, of which she is a Trustee Emeritus. Lear has also been active as a Senior Smithsonian Research Associate, a Beinecke Fellow, and a Senior Research Scholar in History at the University of Maryland, Baltimore County. Lear married John Nickum, Jr. in 1974, and is the mother of one son, Ian Lear-Nickum, born in 1978. She is a resident of Maryland. She is an amateur horticulturist and collector of botanical art.

== Writing ==
Lear developed an interest in Rachel Carson while teaching environmental history in the 1970s. She conducted over 300 interviews over 15 years, eventually meeting Carson's former assistant, Shirley Briggs, and editor, Paul Brooks. She published her biography Rachel Carson: Witness for Nature in 1997; two years later it received the Margaret W. Rossiter History of Women in Science Prize from the History of Science Society. She has continued to write extensively on Carson, contributing introductions to a variety of new editions of her works and editing her unpublished writings for publication. Lear is also the author of a biography of Beatrix Potter, titled Beatrix Potter: A Life in Nature, published in 2007; it has received various awards, including the Lakeland Book of the Year, the Bookends Prize for biography, and the Delta Kappa Gamma literary prize.

Lear's archival materials on Carson and Potter are held by the Linda Lear Center for Special Collections & Archives at Connecticut College, established in 2008. The college awarded her its Goodwin-Niering Center Alumni Environmental Achievement Award in 1999.

== Works ==
=== As writer ===
- Harold L. Ickes: The Aggressive Progressive, 1874–1933, Garland Publishing (New York, NY), 1981.
- Rachel Carson: Witness for Nature, Holt (New York, NY), 1997
- Beatrix Potter, a Life in Nature, St. Martin's Press (New York, NY), 2007.

==== As editor ====
- Lost Woods: The Discovered Writings of Rachel Carson, Beacon Press, 1998.

Lear is also the author of introductions for editions of Carson's The Sense of Wonder (HarperCollins (New York, NY), 1998); Silent Spring (Houghton Mifflin, 2002); and Under the Sea-Wind (2007).
