= Statue of Rachel Carson =

Monument in Woods Hole, Massachusetts, United States

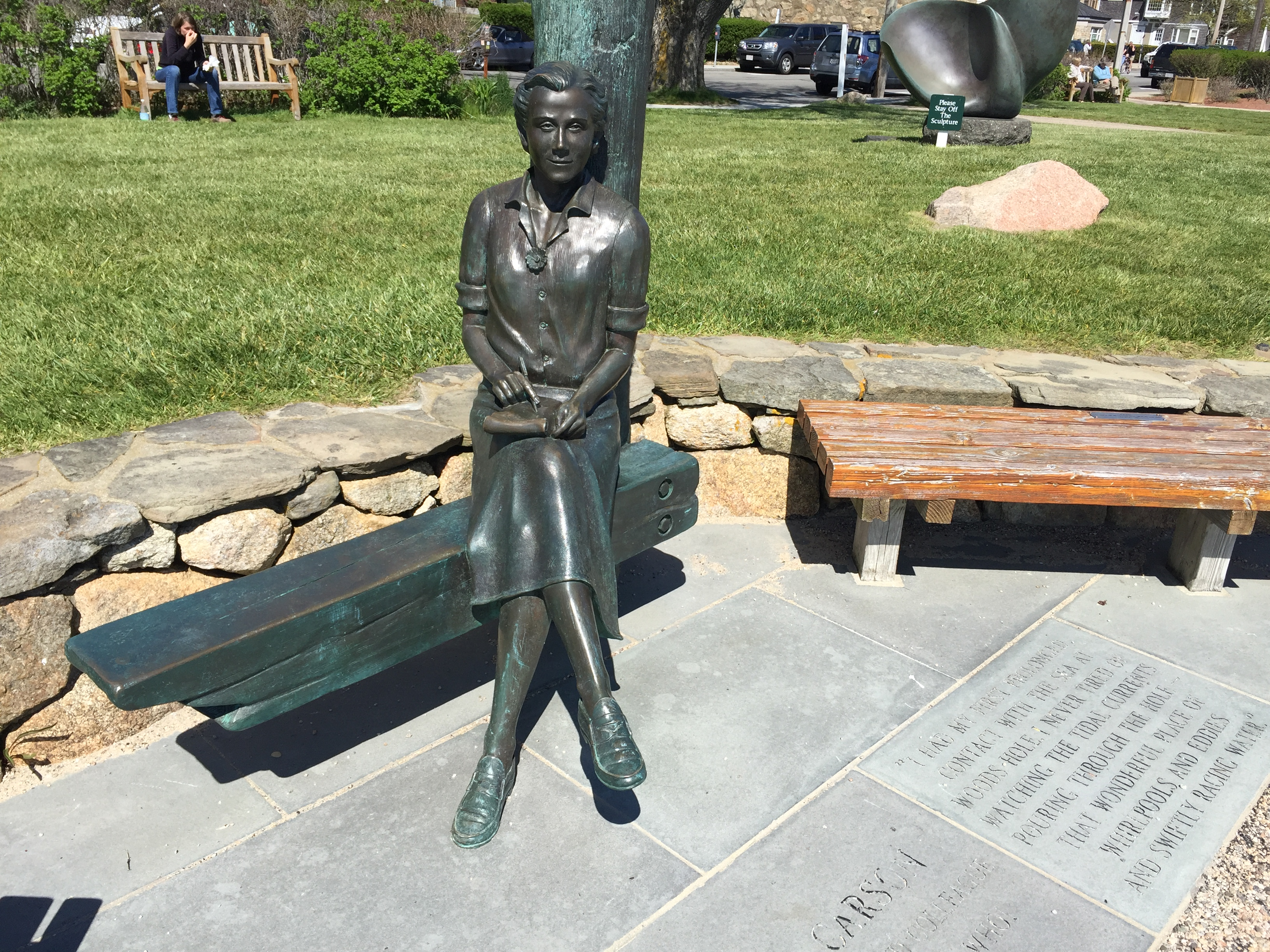
- Artist: David Lewis
- Year: 2013
- Subject: Rachel Carson
- Location: Woods Hole, Massachusetts, United States; 41.52495°N 70.67254°W

An outdoor sculpture depicting the biologist, conservationist, and author Rachel Carson by David Lewis was installed in Waterfront Park in Woods Hole, Massachusetts, United States, on July 14, 2013.

== History ==
The initial plans for the Rachel Carson outdoor statue at Waterfront Park in Woods Hole, Massachusetts were announced September 27, 2012, the 50th anniversary of the publication of Silent Spring. The statue is based on a 1951 photograph by Edwin Gray that was taken on the dock near Sam Cahoon's Fish Market in Woods Hole. The concept for the statue originally came from Eric Turkington who later served as a co-chair of the Rachel Carson Statue Committee along with Susan Shephard. Additional committee and members included Catherine Bumpus, James "Jim" Crossen, Mary Pat Flynn, Jack Moakley, and Marsha Zafiriou. The committee had a funding goal of $90,000, half of which was filled by a $7,500 matching grant from the Bank of Woods Hole, and an anonymous donor who donated a $5,000 matching grant. The sculpture was constructed by David Lewis who estimated the piece would take a year to complete.

== Dedication ==
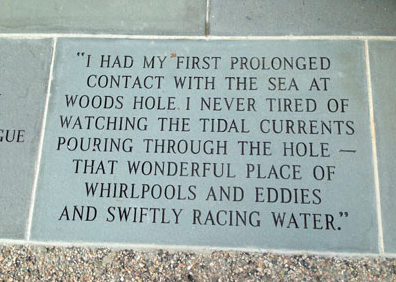
Rachel Carson's words are engraved on a stone at the base of the statue, which faces Great Harbor and Woods Hole passage.

The dedication ceremony was held on July 14, 2013. It focused on Carson's local connection to Woods Hole. Gary Borisy, a former president and director of the Marine Biological Laboratory, spoke at the event, calling Carson "a scientific daughter of this place" and "a marine biologist who kicked the hornets' nest." Additional speakers included the current president and director of the Laboratory Joan Ruderman, Susan Avery, president of the Woods Hole Oceanographic Institution, the science and research director of the Northeast Fisheries Science Center, William Karp and Cheryl Osimo, the co-founder of the Silent Spring Institute.

== Gallery ==
Images from the dedication ceremony

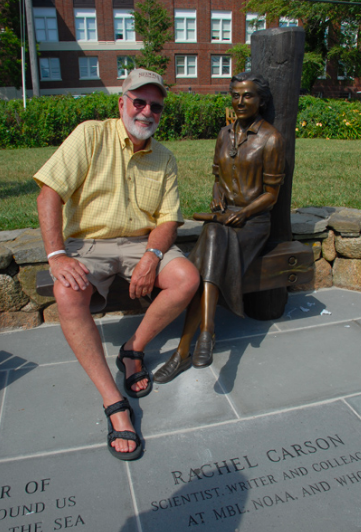
Statue sculptor David Lewis

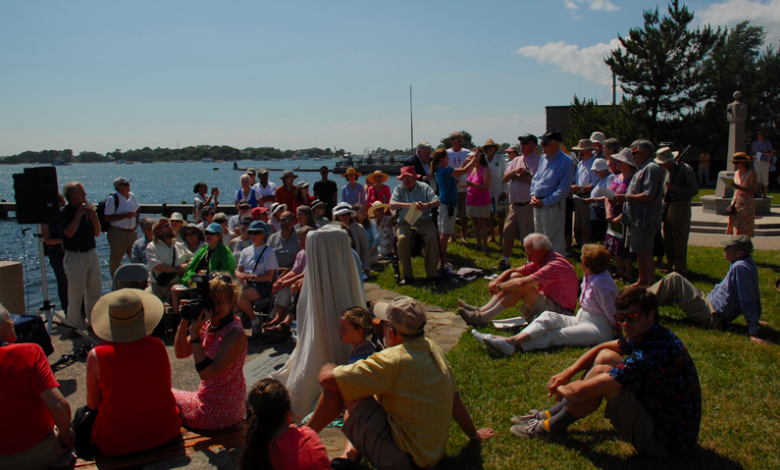
Unveiling

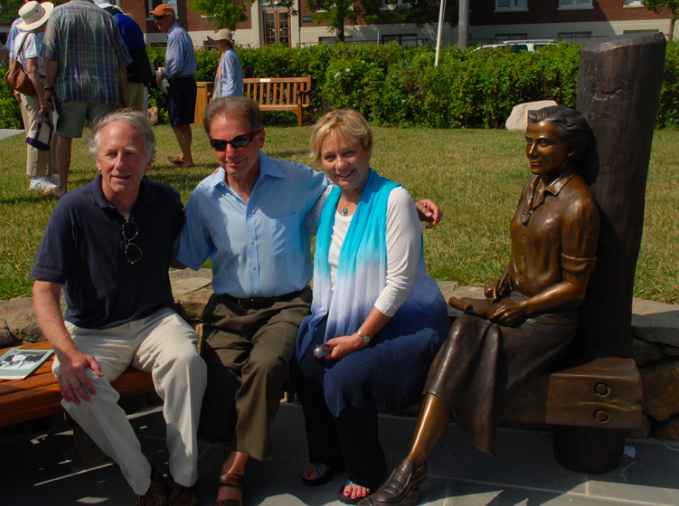
Eric Turkington, Gary Borisy, and Susan Avery

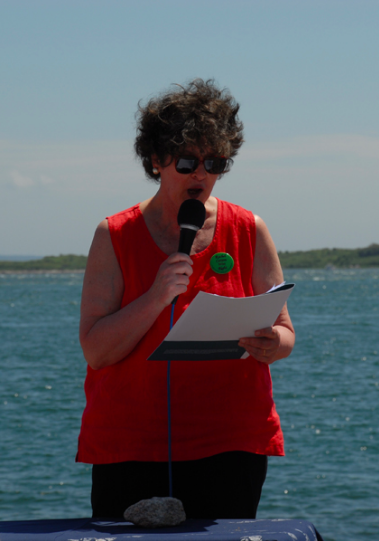
Joan Ruderman

== See also ==
- 2013 in art
