= Susan Avery =

American atmospheric physicist

Susan K. Avery
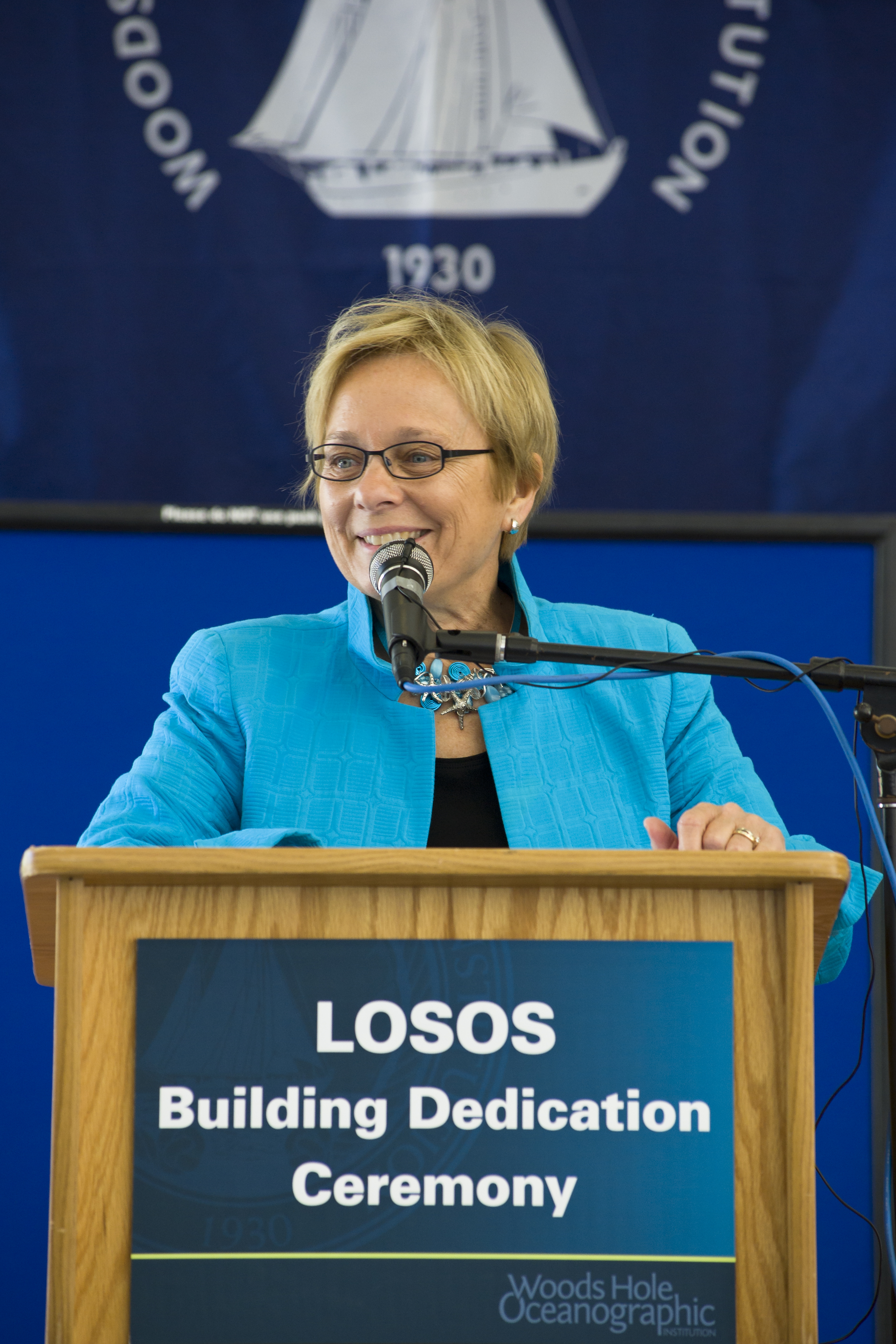
- WHOI President and Director Susan Avery welcoming guests at dedication of LOSOS Laboratory on Quissett Campus, September 20, 2012

President Emerita, Woods Hole Oceanographic Institution (WHOI)

Personal details
- Born: January 5, 1950 (age 76) Detroit, Michigan
- Spouse(s): James P. Avery, Ph.D.
- Education: Michigan State University, University of Illinois
- Profession: Atmospheric scientist

Susan K. Avery (born 1950) is an American atmospheric physicist and President Emerita of the Woods Hole Oceanographic Institution (WHOI) in Massachusetts, where she led the marine science and engineering research organization from 2008–2015. She was the ninth president and director and the first woman to hold the leadership role at WHOI. She is Professor Emerita at the University of Colorado, Boulder (UCB), where she served on the faculty from 1982–2008. While at UCB she also served in various administrative positions, including director of the Cooperative Institute for Research in Environmental Sciences (CIRES), a 550-member collaborative institute between UCB and the National Oceanic and Atmospheric Administration (NOAA) (1994-2004); and interim positions (2004-2007) as vice chancellor for research and dean of the graduate school, and provost and executive vice chancellor for academic affairs. Currently she is a senior fellow at the Consortium for Ocean Leadership in Washington, D.C.

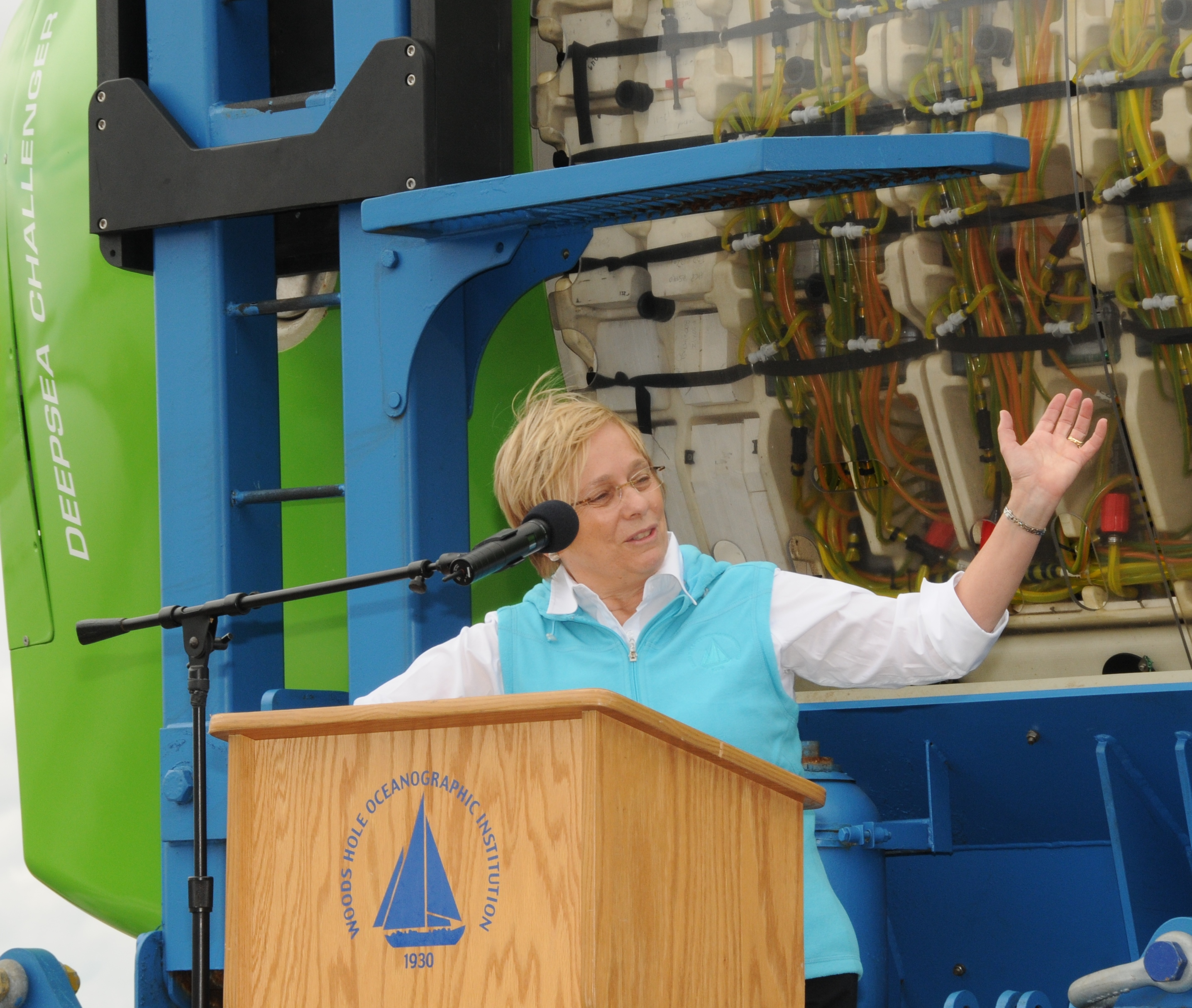
Susan Avery speaking at a dockside ceremony in June 2013 to celebrate the arrival of DEEPSEA CHALLENGER vehicle donated to WHOI by James Cameron.

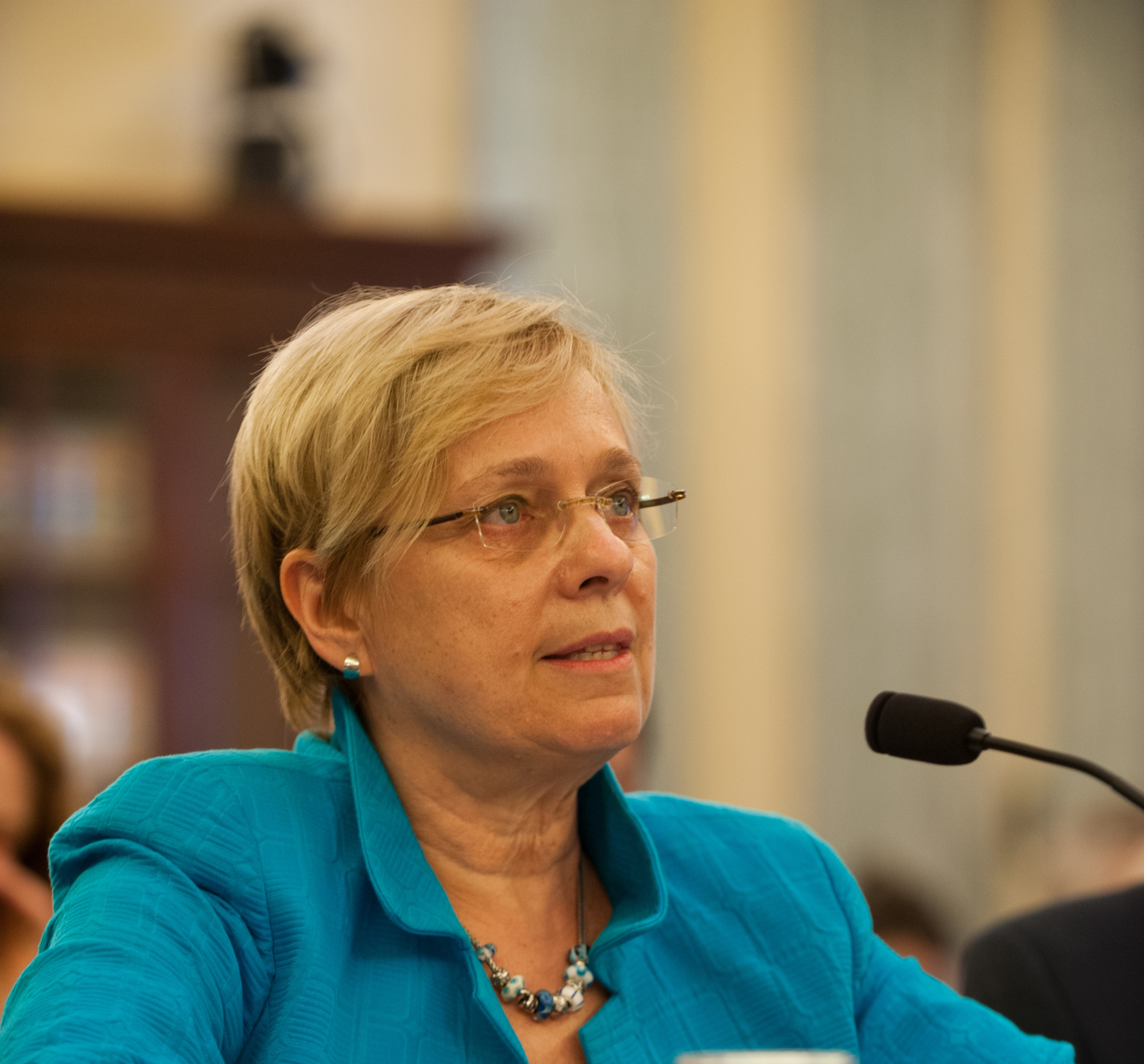
Susan Avery and James Cameron testified before the U.S. Senate Committee on Commerce, Science and Transportation, Subcommittee on Oceans, Atmosphere, Fisheries on June 11, 2013 at a hearing on Deep Sea Challenge: Innovative Partnerships in Ocean Observation.

== Education and career ==
Avery began her undergraduate study in physics at Michigan State University, focusing on the physics of the natural world. She specialized in how atmospheric waves propagate in the stratosphere, earning her doctorate in atmospheric science from the University of Illinois at Urbana-Champaign in 1978.

After earning her master's and doctoral degrees at the University of Illinois, she began a career studying atmospheric science and technologies, with a strong interest in incorporating science into public policy and decision support. Avery secured her first faculty position in the University of Illinois' electrical-engineering department. This post enabled Avery to embark on her own research and teaching. Her research included studies of atmospheric circulation and precipitation, climate variability and water resources, and the development of new radar techniques and instruments for remote sensing. The author or co-author of more than 90 peer-reviewed articles, Avery helped form an integrated science and assessment program that examines the impacts of climate variability on water in the American West.

Supported by two fellowships from the National Science Foundation and CIRES she moved to the University of Colorado-Boulder in 1982. She built collaborations at the National Center for Atmospheric Research (NCAR) and NOAA. Avery developed new radar technology that allowed the first measurements of wind in the upper atmosphere in remote equatorial regions, leading to years of collaborations in the tropics and polar regions. She attained the academic rank of professor of electrical and computer engineering in 1992. After earning tenure, she accepted a position as associate dean of research and graduate education in the College of Engineering and Applied Science. From 1994–2004, she served as director of the Cooperative Institute for Research in Environmental Sciences (CIRES), the first woman and first engineer to hold that position. There, she facilitated new interdisciplinary research efforts spanning the geosciences while bringing them together with social and biological sciences. She helped form an integrated science and assessment program that examines the impacts of climate variability on water in the American West and established a K-12 outreach program and a Center for Science and Technology Policy Research - efforts to make CIRES research more applicable, understandable, and accessible to the public. As director of CIRES, Avery worked with NOAA and the Climate Change Science Program to help formulate a national strategic science plan for climate research. From 2004–2007, she served in interim positions as vice chancellor for research and dean of the graduate school, as well as provost and executive vice chancellor for academic affairs at the University of Colorado at Boulder.

Avery became the president and director of Woods Hole Oceanographic Institution on February 4, 2008. During her tenure at WHOI, she led the development of an intermediate strategy for the institution to attain fiscal stability based on an external and internal landscape analysis. Implementation included structural changes in operations (fiscal and administrative), selective investments in new areas, including the Center for Marine Robotics; a new building for ocean observatories; an ocean informatics program, and strategic hiring in climate and coastal research. She oversaw the completion of major technology projects (Ocean Observatories Initiative, design and construction of the submersible Alvin replacement, and acquisition of a new ship, R/V Neil Armstrong), and she brought focus to increased work on the application of ocean science to societal issues. Major examples include: Deepwater Horizon oil spill(2010); the magnitude 7.0 earthquake in Haiti (2010); the successful search to locate the deep water wreckage of Air France flight 447 in the southern mid-Atlantic (2011); and the measurement of oceanic radionuclides from the disaster at Fukushima (2011). She encouraged development of new funding resources through a restructured fund-raising office, partnerships with other national and international academic and research organizations, and outreach through events that opened the doors of the institution to the local and regional community.

Dr. Avery has given scientific presentations to a wide variety of lay and professional audiences, including TEDx Boston. She has been active in Congressional outreach, including testimony and briefings; active in US and international consortia dedicated to ocean research, observing, and application; and worked with the Governor's committee to develop the Massachusetts Clean Energy and Climate Plan for 2020. In 2013 Avery was named to the United Nations’ newly created scientific advisory board.

=== Research interests ===
Avery's research interests include studies of atmospheric circulation and precipitation, climate variability and water resources, and the development of new radar techniques and instruments for remote sensing. She has participated in field expeditions in Greenland, Antarctica, and Australia, and she has an interest in scientific literacy and the role of science in public policy. She has also been a vocal advocate for earth system research, especially the coupling between the atmosphere and the ocean.

=== Courses taught ===
Circuits and Electronics I; Linear System Theory; Upper Atmosphere Dynamics (course development); Chemistry and Physics of the Middle Atmosphere; Introduction to Radar and Remote Sensing (course development); Radar Science and Techniques (course development); Geophysical Data Analysis (course development); Policy Responses to Global Environmental Change.

== Service on boards and committees ==
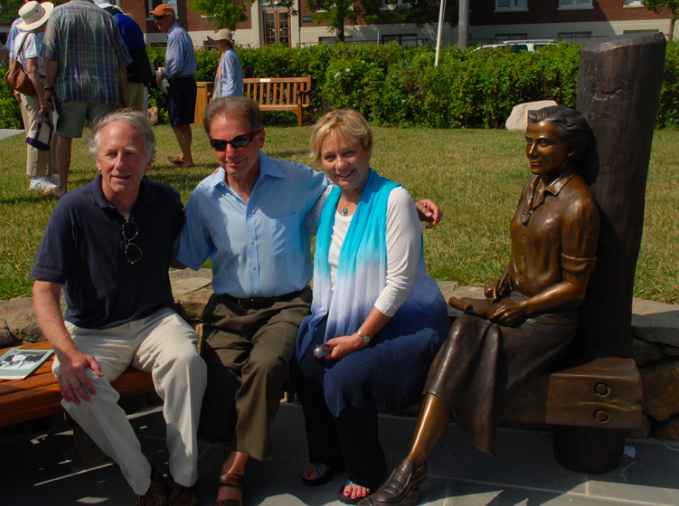
Eric Turkington with former MBL President and Director Gary Borisy and Susan Avery at the dedication of the statue of Rachel Carson.

She has served on many national and international boards, committees, commissions, and program review committees, and is active in professional societies. Her current service includes the UN Science Advisory Board; the National Research Council Global Change Research Program Advisory Committee; the NOAA Science Advisory Board; the NASA Science Advisory Committee; the National Park Service Advisory Committee, and the Leadership Alliance External Advisory Board. She is a fellow of the Institute of Electrical and Electronics Engineers, the American Association for the Advancement of Science, and the American Meteorological Society, for which she also served as president. She is also a member of the American Geophysical Union and the Marine Technology Society. Currently she is a senior fellow with the Consortium for Ocean Leadership. Awards and recognition include an honorary degree from University of Massachusetts; charter membership of the National Associate Program in the National Academy of Sciences; the Stearns Award from the University of Colorado for exceptional achievement; and an Alumni Achievement Award and Distinguished Ogura Lectureship in the Department of Atmospheric Sciences from the University of Illinois.

In 2017 she was elected to the board of ExxonMobil. At ExxonMobil, Avery received $3.8M in compensation.

== Honors and awards ==
- Outstanding Publication Award of the National Center for Atmospheric Research (1990)
- National Science Foundation Faculty Award for Women (1991)
- Margaret Willard Award of the University Women's Club, for contributions to the University of Colorado at Boulder(1995)
- National Science Foundation Visiting Professorship for Women in Science and Engineering, 1982–83
- Elizabeth Gee Memorial Lectureship Award, recognition for scholarly contributions, distinguished teaching and advancing women in the academic community, University of Colorado(1998)
- University of Colorado Robert L Stearns Award, recognition for exceptional achievement and/or service (1999)
- Charter Member of the National Associates Program of the National Academies of Science, recognition of contributions to the National Academies through pro bono service to the National Research Council (2001)
- Fellow of the American Meteorological Society, 1994
- Fellow of the Institute of Electrical and Electronics Engineers, 1998
- Fellow of the American Association for the Advancement of Science, 2011
- President of the American Meteorological Society (2004)
- University of Illinois, Department of Atmospheric Sciences, Distinguished Ogura Lectureship, 2005
- University of Illinois, College of Liberal Arts and Sciences, Alumni Achievement Award, 2005
- Business and Professional Women/USA National Business Women's Week Woman of Achievement Award, October 2009
- University of Massachusetts, Dartmouth, Honorary Degree, 2012

== Selected editorials, letters, statements, talks, interviews ==
It’s been a privilege to lead WHOI: Statement to WHOI, June 29, 2015

Presentation to the WHOI Board and Corporation (The Pillars of WHOI), May 21, 2015

Sea Stories: Presentation to the WHOI Board of Trustees, May 20, 2015

Wenju Cai, Susan K Avery, Margaret Leinen, Kenneth Lee, Xiaopei Lin, Martin Visbeck: Commentary: Institutional coordination of global ocean observations: Nature Clim. Change, 5, 4-6 (2015)

Research Independence and Integrity, May 25, 2014

Congressional Testimony: Driving Innovations through Federal Investments, April 29, 2014

Congressional Testimony: Deep Sea Challenge: Innovative Partnerships in Ocean Observing, June 11, 2013

Remarks on the Occasion of the Christening of the R/V Neil Armstrong, Anacortes, WA, March 29, 2014

Letter to U.S. House and Senate Leadership: Fiscal Cliff Impacts, December 26, 2012

The Titanic: Seeing is Knowing: Boston Globe Online, April 13, 2012

World Ocean Day Statement: The Importance of Looking Closer to Home, June 8, 2010

Deepwater Horizon Oil Statement, May 26, 2010

World Climate Summit, Ocean Day: Changing Climate, Changing Ocean, 2009

Congressional Testimony: How the Mission and Related Research of NOAA Contribute to the National Science Program, 2009

Strategic Actions for the next Administration: Preparing the Nation for Climate Change, 2008

Index of the Massachusetts Innovation Economy, Massachusetts Technology Collaborative, Feature Editorial “Creative Collaborations to Sustain Momentum,” 2008.

The Oceans and Us, TEDx Boston talk, August 13, 2010

WCAI Living Lab interview, WHOI begins search for new leader, November 17, 2014

WCAI Living Lab interview, A Tour of 2012's Science Highlights, December 31, 2012

WCAI Living Lab interview, The Politics of Science Funding, October 15, 2012
