= Rachel Carson =

American marine biologist and conservationist (1907–1964)

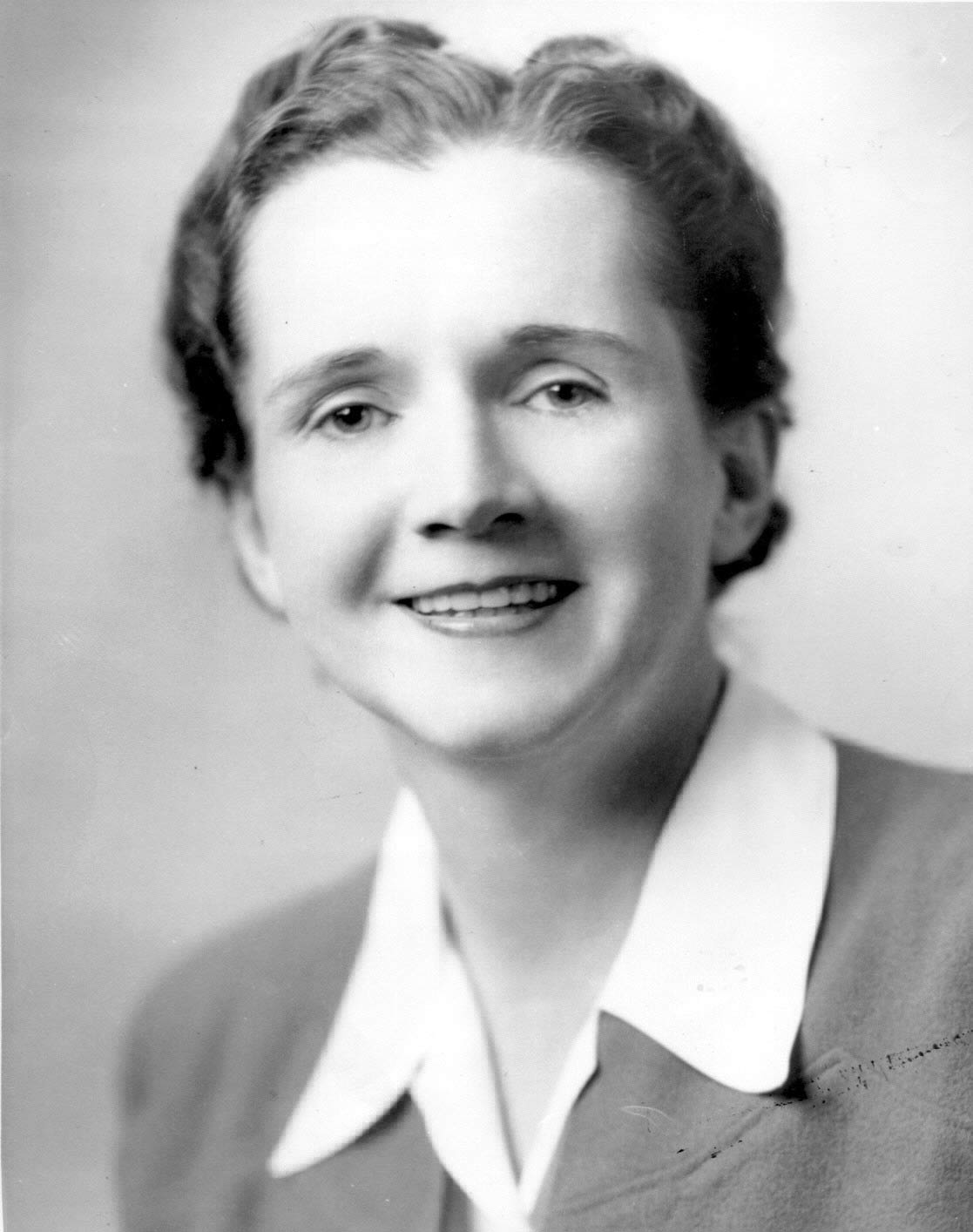
- Carson in 1943
- Born: Rachel Louise Carson; May 27, 1907; Springdale, Pennsylvania, U.S.
- Died: April 14, 1964 (aged 56); Silver Spring, Maryland, U.S.
- Education: Chatham University (BA); Johns Hopkins University (MS)
- Occupations: Marine biologist, author and environmentalist
- Writing career
- Period: 1937–1964
- Genre: Nature writing
- Subjects: Marine biology, ecology, pesticides
- Notable works: Under the Sea Wind (1941); The Sea Around Us (1951); The Edge of the Sea (1955); Silent Spring (1962)

Rachel Louise Carson (May 27, 1907 – April 14, 1964) was an American marine biologist, writer, and conservationist whose sea trilogy (1941–1955) and book Silent Spring (1962) are credited with advancing marine conservation and the global environmental movement.

Carson began her career as an aquatic biologist in the U.S. Bureau of Fisheries, and became a full-time nature writer in the 1950s. Her widely praised 1951 bestseller The Sea Around Us won her a U.S. National Book Award, recognition as a gifted writer, and financial security. Its success prompted the republication of her first book, Under the Sea Wind (1941), in 1952, which was followed by The Edge of the Sea in 1955 — both were also bestsellers. This sea trilogy explores the whole of ocean life from the shores to the depths.

Late in the 1950s, Carson turned her attention to conservation, especially some problems she believed were caused by synthetic pesticides. The result was the book Silent Spring (1962), which brought environmental concerns to an unprecedented share of the American people. Although Silent Spring was met with fierce opposition by chemical companies, it spurred a reversal in national pesticide policy, which led to a nationwide ban on DDT and other pesticides. It also inspired a grassroots environmental movement that led to the creation of the U.S. Environmental Protection Agency. Carson was posthumously awarded the Presidential Medal of Freedom by President Jimmy Carter.

== Early life and education ==
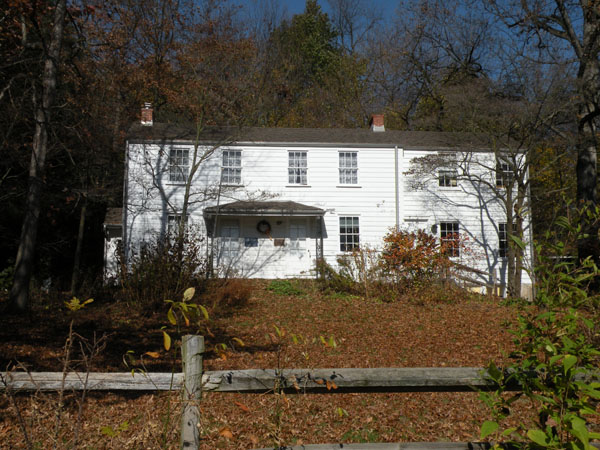
Carson's childhood home, the Rachel Carson Homestead, in Springdale, Pennsylvania, in November 2009

Carson was born on May 27, 1907, on a family farm near Springdale, Pennsylvania, located by the Allegheny River near Pittsburgh. She was the daughter of Maria Frazier (McLean) and Robert Warden Carson, an insurance salesman. She spent a lot of time exploring around her family's 65-acre (26 ha) farm. An avid reader, she began writing stories, often involving animals, at age eight. At age ten, she had her first story published. She enjoyed reading St. Nicholas Magazine, which carried her first published stories, the works of Beatrix Potter, the novels of Gene Stratton-Porter, and in her teen years, Herman Melville, Joseph Conrad, and Robert Louis Stevenson. The natural world, particularly that of the ocean, was the common thread of her favorite literature. Carson attended Springdale's small school through tenth grade, and then completed high school in nearby Parnassus, Pennsylvania, graduating in 1925 at the top of her class of 44 students. In high school, Carson was said to have been somewhat of a loner.

Carson gained admission to Pennsylvania College for Women, now Chatham University, in Pittsburgh, where she originally studied English but switched her major to biology in January 1928. She continued contributing to the school's student newspaper and literary supplement.

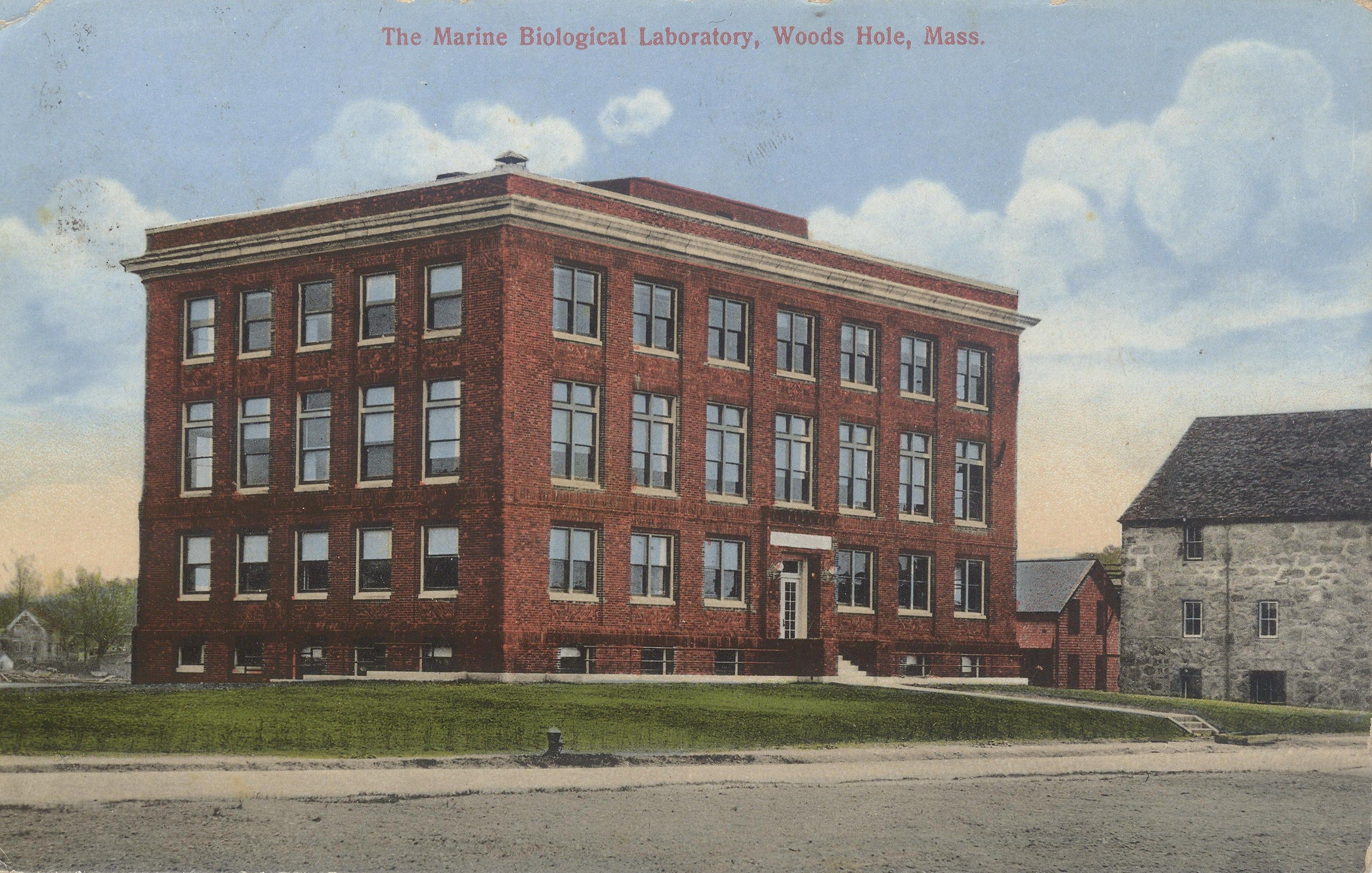
Carson first attended the Marine Biological Laboratory (MBL) in 1929, remaining a member until her death. Her time at MBL inspired her love for the sea

She was admitted to graduate school at Johns Hopkins University in Baltimore in 1928, but was forced to remain at the Pennsylvania College for Women for her senior year due to financial difficulties. In 1929, she graduated magna cum laude. In the summer of 1929, Carson moved to Woods Hole, Massachusetts for a course at the Marine Biological Laboratory (MBL). While at MBL, Carson wrote a "detailed anatomical study of the brain and cranial nerves of a turtle". Her time at MBL had a profound impact on Carson, who later stated that her "first prolonged contact with the sea [was] at Woods Hole", where she "first discovered the scientific literature of the sea". That fall, she continued her studies in zoology and genetics at Johns Hopkins. After her first year of graduate school, Carson became a part-time student, taking an assistantship in Raymond Pearl's laboratory, where she worked with rats and Drosophila, to earn money for tuition. After false starts with pit vipers and squirrels, she completed a dissertation on the embryonic development of the pronephros (urinary organ) in fish.

In June 1932, she earned a master's degree in zoology. She had intended to continue for a doctorate, however in 1934 Carson was forced to leave Johns Hopkins to search for a full-time teaching position to help support her family during the Great Depression. In 1935, Carson's father died suddenly, worsening their already critical financial situation and leaving Carson to care for her aging mother.

== Career ==
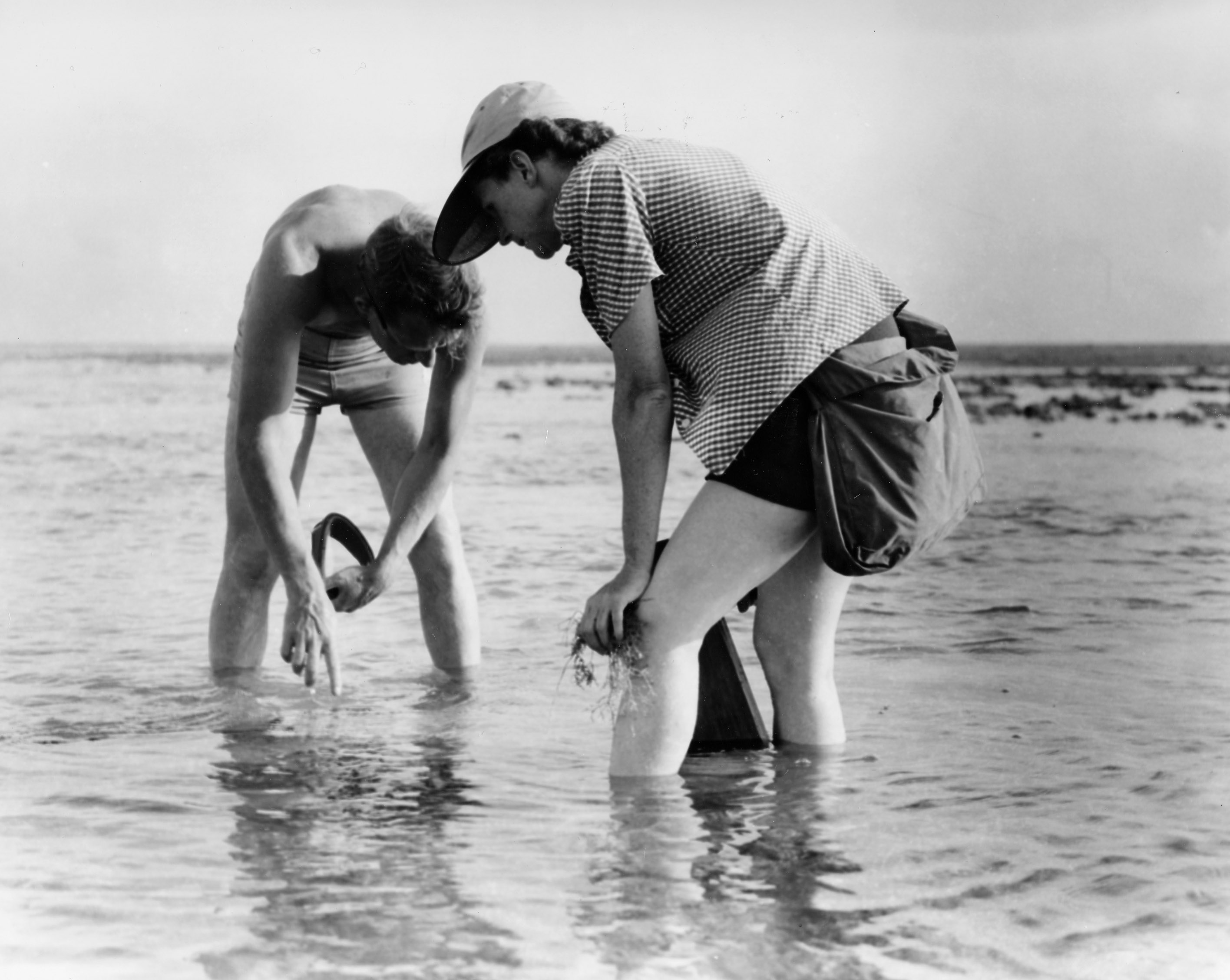
Carson and Bob Hines researching off the East Coast in 1952

Rachel Carson as told by EPA administrator Gina McCarthy

At the urging of Mary Scott Skinker, her undergraduate biology mentor, Carson secured a temporary position with the U.S. Bureau of Fisheries, where she wrote radio copy for a series of weekly educational broadcasts called Romance Under the Waters. The series of 52 seven-minute programs focused on aquatic life and was intended to generate public interest in fish biology and the bureau's work, a task that several writers before Carson had not managed. Carson also began submitting articles on marine life in the Chesapeake Bay, based on her research for the series, to local newspapers and magazines. Carson earned extra money as a lecturer at the University of Maryland's Dental and Pharmacy Schools and Johns Hopkins University.

Carson's supervisor, pleased with the success of the radio series, asked her to write the introduction to a public brochure about the fisheries bureau; he also worked to secure her the first full-time position that became available. Sitting for the civil service exam, she outscored all other applicants and, in 1936, became the second woman hired by the Bureau of Fisheries for a full-time professional position, as a junior aquatic biologist.

Using her research and consultations with marine biologists as starting points, she wrote a steady stream of articles for The Baltimore Sun and other newspapers. However, her family responsibilities further increased in January 1937 when her older sister died, leaving Carson as the sole breadwinner for her mother and two nieces.

In July 1937, the Atlantic Monthly accepted a revised version of an essay, The World of Waters, that she originally wrote for her first fisheries bureau brochure. Her supervisor had deemed it too good for that purpose. The essay, published as Undersea, was a vivid narrative of a journey along the ocean floor. It marked a major turning point in Carson's writing career. Publishing house Simon & Schuster, impressed by Undersea, contacted Carson and suggested that she expand it into a book. Several years of writing resulted in Under the Sea Wind (1941), which received excellent reviews but sold poorly. In the meantime, Carson's article-writing success continued with her features appearing in Sun Magazine, Nature, and Collier's. Carson attempted to leave the Bureau (by then transformed into the United States Fish and Wildlife Service) in 1945. However, few jobs for naturalists were available, since most money for science was focused on technical fields in the wake of the Manhattan Project.

In mid-1945, Carson first encountered the subject of DDT, a revolutionary new pesticide—lauded as the "insect bomb" after the atomic bombings of Hiroshima and Nagasaki—that was only beginning to undergo tests for safety and ecological effects. DDT was one of Carson's many writing interests at the time, but editors found the subject unappealing; she published nothing on DDT until 1962.

Carson rose within the Fish and Wildlife Service, and in 1945 was supervising a small writing staff. In 1949, she was appointed chief editor of publications, which allowed her increased opportunities for fieldwork and freedom in choosing her writing projects; however, it also entailed increasingly tedious administrative responsibilities. By 1948, Carson was working on material for a second book and decided to begin a transition to writing full-time. That year, she took on a literary agent, Marie Rodell; they formed a close professional relationship that would last the rest of Carson's career.

Oxford University Press expressed interest in Carson's book proposal for a life history of the ocean, spurring her to complete by early 1950 the manuscript of what would become The Sea Around Us. Chapters appeared in Science Digest and The Yale Review, which published a chapter, "The Birth of an Island," which won the American Association for the Advancement of Science's George Westinghouse Science Writing Prize. Beginning in June 1951, nine chapters were serialized in The New Yorker.

On July 2, 1951, the book was published by Oxford University Press. The Sea Around Us remained on The New York Times Bestseller List for 86 weeks, was abridged by Reader's Digest, won the 1952 National Book Award for Nonfiction and the John Burroughs Medal, and resulted in Carson being awarded two honorary doctorates. She licensed a documentary film based on it, The Sea, whose success led to republication of Under the Sea Wind, which became a bestseller. With success came financial security; in 1952, Carson was able to give up her job in order to concentrate on writing full-time.

Carson was inundated with requests for speaking engagements, fan mail and other correspondence regarding The Sea Around Us, along with work on the script that she had secured the right to review. She was very unhappy with the final version of the script by writer, director, and producer Irwin Allen; she found it untrue to the atmosphere of the book and scientifically embarrassing, describing it as "a cross between a believe-it-or-not and a breezy travelogue." However, she discovered that her right to review the script did not extend to any control over its content. This led to many scientific inconsistencies inside the film. Despite Carson's requests to resolve these problems, Allen went forward with the script. He succeeded in producing a very successful documentary. It went on to win the 1953 Academy Award for Best Documentary Feature. However, Carson was so embittered by the experience that she never again sold film rights to her work.

=== The Edge of the Sea and transition to conservation work ===
Early in 1953, Carson began library and field research on the ecology and organisms of the Atlantic shore. In 1955, she completed the third volume of her sea trilogy, The Edge of the Sea, which focuses on life in coastal ecosystems, particularly along the Eastern Seaboard. It appeared in The New Yorker in two condensed installments shortly before its October 26 book release by Houghton Mifflin (again a new publisher). By this time, Carson's reputation for clear and poetical prose was well established; The Edge of the Sea received highly favorable reviews, if not quite as enthusiastic as for The Sea Around Us.

Through 1955 and 1956, Carson worked on several projects—including the script for an Omnibus episode, "Something About the Sky"—and wrote articles for popular magazines. Her plan for the next book was to address evolution. However, the publication of Julian Huxley's Evolution in Action—and her own difficulty in finding a clear and compelling approach to the topic—led her to abandon the project. Instead, her interests were turning to conservation. She considered an environment-themed book project tentatively titled Remembrance of the Earth and became involved with The Nature Conservancy and other conservation groups. She also made plans to buy and preserve from development an area in Maine she and Freeman called the "Lost Woods."

In early 1957, a family tragedy struck for the third time when one of her nieces she had cared for since the 1940s died at the age of 31, leaving her 5-year-old son, Roger Christie, an orphan. Carson took on the responsibility for Roger when she adopted him, along with caring for her aging mother. Carson moved to Silver Spring, Maryland to care for Roger and spent much of 1957 putting together a new living situation and studying specific environmental threats.

By late 1957, Carson was closely following federal proposals for widespread pesticide spraying; the United States Department of Agriculture (USDA) planned to eradicate fire ants. Other spraying programs involving chlorinated hydrocarbons and organophosphates were on the rise. For the rest of her life, Carson's main professional focus would be the dangers of pesticide overuse.

=== Silent Spring ===
Silent Spring, Carson's most influential book, was published by Houghton Mifflin on September 27, 1962. The book described the harmful effects of pesticides on the environment, and is widely credited with helping launch the environmental movement. Carson was not the first or the only person to raise concern about DDT, but her combination of "scientific knowledge and poetic writing" reached a broad audience and helped to focus opposition to DDT use. In 1994, an edition of Silent Spring was published with an introduction written by Vice President Al Gore. In 2012 Silent Spring was designated a National Historic Chemical Landmark by the American Chemical Society for its role in the development of the modern environmental movement.

==== Research and writing ====
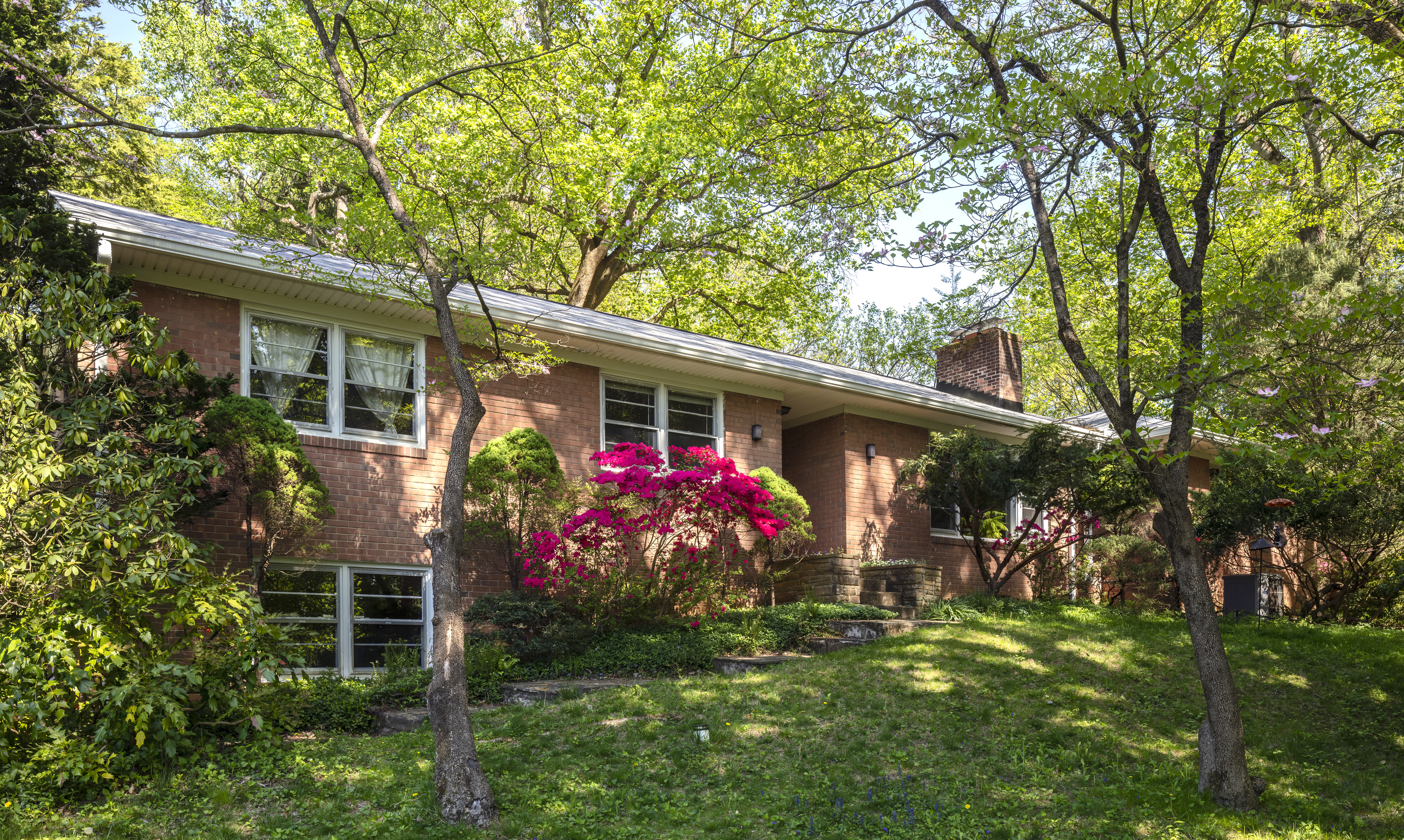
Carson's house in Colesville, Maryland, where she wrote Silent Spring

Starting in the mid-1940s, Carson had become concerned about the use of synthetic pesticides, many of which had been developed through the military funding of science since World War II. However, the United States federal government's 1957 gypsy moth, now called spongy moth, eradication program prompted Carson to devote her research and her next book to pesticides and environmental poisons. The gypsy moth program involved aerial spraying of DDT and other pesticides mixed with fuel oil, including the spraying of private land. Landowners on Long Island filed a lawsuit to have the spraying stopped, and many in affected regions followed the case closely. Though the suit was lost, the Supreme Court granted petitioners the right to gain injunctions against potential environmental damage in the future; this laid the basis for later successful environmental actions.

The Audubon Naturalist Society also actively opposed such spraying programs and recruited Carson to help make public the government's exact spraying practices and the related research. Carson began the four-year project of what would become Silent Spring by gathering examples of environmental damage attributed to DDT. She also attempted to enlist others to join the cause, such as essayist E. B. White and several journalists and scientists. By 1958, Carson had arranged a book deal, with plans to co-write with Newsweek science journalist Edwin Diamond. However, when The New Yorker commissioned a long and well-paid article on the topic from Carson, she began considering writing more than simply the introduction and conclusion as planned; soon, it was a solo project. (Diamond would later write one of the harshest critiques of Silent Spring).

As her research progressed, Carson found a sizable community of scientists who were documenting the physiological and environmental effects of pesticides. She also took advantage of her connections with many government scientists, who supplied her with confidential information. From reading the scientific literature and interviewing scientists, Carson found two scientific camps when it came to pesticides: those who dismissed the possible danger of pesticide spraying barring conclusive proof, and those who were open to the possibility of harm and willing to consider alternative methods such as biological pest control.

She also found significant support and extensive evidence from a group of biodynamic agriculture organic market gardeners, their adviser, Dr. Ehrenfried Pfeiffer, other contacts, and their suite of legal actions (1957–1960) against the U.S. Government. According to recent research by Paull (2013), this may have been the primary and (for strategic reasons) uncredited source for Carson's book. Marjorie Spock and Mary T. Richards of Long Island, New York, contested the aerial spraying of dichlorodiphenyltrichloroethane (DDT). They compiled their evidence and shared it with Carson, who used it, their extensive contacts, and the trial transcripts as a primary input for Silent Spring. Carson wrote of the content as "a gold mine of information" and says, "I feel guilty about the mass of your material I have here" and makes multiple references to Pfeiffer and his correspondence.

By 1959, the USDA's Agricultural Research Service responded to the criticism by Carson and others with a public service film, Fire Ant on Trial; Carson characterized it as "flagrant propaganda" that ignored the dangers that spraying pesticides (especially dieldrin and heptachlor) posed to humans and wildlife. That spring, Carson wrote a letter, published in The Washington Post, that attributed the recent decline in bird populations—in her words, the "silencing of birds"—to pesticide overuse. That was also the year of the "Great Cranberry Scandal": the 1957, 1958, and 1959 crops of U.S. cranberries were found to contain high levels of the herbicide aminotriazole (which caused cancer in laboratory rats), and the sale of all cranberry products was halted. Carson attended the subsequent FDA hearings on revising pesticide regulations; she came away discouraged by the aggressive tactics of the chemical industry representatives, which included expert testimony that was firmly contradicted by the bulk of the scientific literature she had been studying. She also wondered about the possible "financial inducements behind certain pesticide programs."

Research at the Library of Medicine of the National Institutes of Health brought Carson into contact with medical researchers investigating the gamut of cancer-causing chemicals. Of particular significance was the work of National Cancer Institute researcher and environmental cancer section founding director Wilhelm Hueper, who classified many pesticides as carcinogens. Carson and her research assistant Jeanne Davis, with the help of NIH librarian Dorothy Algire, found evidence to support the pesticide-cancer connection; to Carson, the evidence for the toxicity of a wide array of synthetic pesticides was clear-cut, though such conclusions were very controversial beyond the small community of scientists studying pesticide carcinogenesis.

By 1960, Carson had more than enough research material, and the writing was progressing rapidly. In addition to the thorough literature search, she had investigated hundreds of individual incidents of pesticide exposure and the human sickness and ecological damage that resulted. However, in January, a duodenal ulcer followed by several infections kept her bedridden for weeks, greatly delaying the completion of Silent Spring. As she was nearing full recovery in March (just as she was completing drafts of the two cancer chapters of her book), she discovered cysts in her left breast, one of which necessitated a mastectomy. Though her doctor described the procedure as precautionary and recommended no further treatment, by December, Carson discovered that the tumor was malignant and the cancer had metastasized. Her research was also delayed by revision work for a new edition of The Sea Around Us and by a collaborative photo essay with Erich Hartmann. Most of the research and writing was done by the fall of 1960, except for the discussion of recent research on biological pest controls and investigations of a handful of new pesticides. However, further health troubles slowed the final revisions in 1961 and early 1962. While writing the book, Carson chose to hide her illness so that the pesticide companies could not use it against her (she worried that if the companies knew, they would use it as ammunition to make her book look untrustworthy and biased).

Finding a title for the book proved difficult; "Silent Spring" was initially suggested as a title for the chapter on birds. By August 1961, Carson finally agreed to the suggestion of her literary agent Marie Rodell: Silent Spring would be a metaphorical title for the entire book, suggesting a bleak future for the whole natural world, rather than a single chapter title about the literal absence of birdsong. With Carson's approval, editor Paul Brooks at Houghton Mifflin arranged for illustrations by Louis and Lois Darling, who also designed the cover. The final writing was the first chapter, A Fable for Tomorrow, which Carson intended as a gentle introduction to what might otherwise be a forbiddingly serious topic. By mid-1962, Brooks and Carson had essentially finished the editing and were laying the groundwork for promoting the book by sending the manuscript out to select individuals for final suggestions.

==== Content ====
Biographer Mark Hamilton Lytle writes that Carson "quite self-consciously decided to write a book calling into question the paradigm of scientific progress that defined post-war American culture." The overriding theme of Silent Spring is the powerful—and often adverse—effect humans have on the natural world.

Carson's main argument is that pesticides have detrimental effects on the environment; they are more properly termed biocides, she argues, because their effects are rarely limited to the target pests. DDT is a prime example, but other synthetic pesticides come under scrutiny, many of which are subject to bioaccumulation. Carson also accuses the chemical industry of intentionally spreading disinformation and public officials of accepting industry claims uncritically. Most of the book is devoted to pesticides' effects on natural ecosystems. However, four chapters also detail cases of human pesticide poisoning, cancer, and other illnesses attributed to pesticides. Regarding DDT and cancer, the subject of so much subsequent debate, Carson only briefly mentions the topic:

In laboratory tests on animal subjects, DDT has produced suspicious liver tumors. Scientists of the Food and Drug Administration who reported the discovery of these tumors were uncertain how to classify them but felt there was some "justification for considering them low grade hepatic cell carcinomas." Dr. Hueper [author of Occupational Tumors and Allied Diseases] now gives DDT the definite rating of a "chemical carcinogen."

Carson predicted increased consequences in the future, especially as targeted pests develop pesticide resistance. At the same time, weakened ecosystems fall prey to unanticipated invasive species. The book closes with a call for a biotic approach to pest control as an alternative to chemical pesticides.

Regarding DDT, Carson never called for an outright ban. Part of the argument she made in Silent Spring was that even if DDT and other insecticides had no environmental side effects, their indiscriminate overuse was counter-productive because it would create insect resistance, making them useless in eliminating the target insect populations:

No responsible person contends that insect-borne disease should be ignored. The question that has now urgently presented itself is whether it is either wise or responsible to attack the problem by methods that are rapidly making it worse. The world has heard much of the triumphant war against disease by controlling insect vectors of infection. However, it has heard little of the other side of the story—the defeats, the short-lived triumphs that now strongly support the alarming view that the insect enemy has been made actually stronger by our efforts. Even worse, we may have destroyed our very means of fighting.

Carson further noted that "Malaria programmes are threatened by resistance among mosquitoes" and emphasized the advice given by the director of Holland's Plant Protection Service: "Practical advice should be 'Spray as little as you possibly can' rather than 'Spray to the limit of your capacity' ... Pressure on the pest population should always be as slight as possible."

==== Promotion and reception ====
Carson and the others involved with the publication of Silent Spring expected fierce criticism. They were particularly concerned about the possibility of being sued for libel. Carson was also undergoing radiation therapy to combat her spreading cancer and expected to have little energy to devote to defending her work and responding to critics. In preparation for the anticipated attacks, Carson and her agent attempted to amass as many prominent supporters as possible before the book's release.

Most of the book's scientific chapters were reviewed by scientists with relevant expertise, among whom Carson found strong support. Carson attended the White House Conference on Conservation in May 1962; Houghton Mifflin distributed proof copies of Silent Spring to many of the delegates and promoted the upcoming New Yorker serialization. Among many others, Carson also sent a proof copy to Supreme Court Associate Justice William O. Douglas, a longtime environmental advocate who had argued against the court's rejection of the Long Island pesticide spraying case (and who had provided Carson with some of the material included in her chapter on herbicides).

Though Silent Spring had generated a relatively high level of interest based on pre-publication promotion, this became much more intense with the serialization in The New Yorker, which began in its June 16, 1962, issue. This brought the book to the attention of the chemical industry and its lobbyists and a wide swath of the American populace. Around that time, Carson also learned that Silent Spring had been selected as the Book of the Month for October; as she put it, this would "carry it to farms and hamlets all over that country that don't know what a bookstore looks like—much less The New Yorker." Other publicity included a positive editorial in The New York Times and excerpts of the serialized version in Audubon magazine, with another round of publicity in July and August as chemical companies responded. The story of the birth defect-causing drug thalidomide broke just before the book's publication as well, inviting comparisons between Carson and Frances Oldham Kelsey, the Food and Drug Administration reviewer who had blocked the drug's sale in the United States.

Following the publication of Silent Spring, Carson as a woman in science faced personal attacks. Linda Lear, Carson's biographer, describes in the Introduction to Silent Spring how critics sought to undermine Carson's arguments by calling her a "bird and bunny lover." In the eyes of the chemical industry, Carson was a "woman out of control," going outside the bounds of her gender by making claims about an industry within the scientific community.

In the weeks leading up to the September 27, 1962, publication, there was strong opposition to Silent Spring from the chemical industry. DuPont (a high market-share manufacturer of DDT and 2,4-D) and Velsicol Chemical Corporation (exclusive manufacturer of chlordane and heptachlor) were among the first to respond. DuPont compiled an extensive report on the book's press coverage and estimated impact on public opinion. Velsicol threatened legal action against Houghton Mifflin and The New Yorker and Audubon unless the planned Silent Spring features were canceled. Chemical industry representatives and lobbyists also lodged a range of non-specific complaints, some anonymously. Chemical companies and associated organizations produced a number of their own brochures and articles promoting and defending pesticide use. However, Carson's and the publishers' lawyers were confident in the vetting process Silent Spring had undergone. The magazine and book publications proceeded as planned, as did the large Book-of-the-Month printing (which included a pamphlet endorsing the book by William O. Douglas).

American Cyanamid biochemist Robert White-Stevens and former Cyanamid chemist Thomas Jukes were among the most aggressive critics, especially of Carson's analysis of DDT. According to White-Stevens, "If man were to follow the teachings of Miss Carson, we would return to the Dark Ages, and the insects and diseases and vermin would once again inherit the earth." Others went further, attacking Carson's scientific credentials (because her training was in marine biology rather than biochemistry) and her character. White-Stevens labeled her "...a fanatic defender of the cult of the balance of nature," while former U.S. Secretary of Agriculture Ezra Taft Benson, in a letter to former President Dwight D. Eisenhower, reportedly concluded that because she was unmarried despite being physically attractive, she was "probably a Communist."

Many critics repeatedly asserted that she was calling for the elimination of all pesticides. However, Carson had made it clear she was not advocating the banning or complete withdrawal of helpful pesticides but was instead encouraging responsible and carefully managed use with an awareness of the chemicals' impact on the entire ecosystem. In fact, she concludes her section on DDT in Silent Spring not by urging a total ban but with advice for spraying as little as possible to limit the development of resistance.

The academic community, including prominent defenders such as H. J. Muller, Loren Eiseley, Clarence Cottam, and Frank Egler, by and large, backed the book's scientific claims; public opinion soon turned Carson's way as well. The chemical industry campaign backfired, as the controversy greatly increased public awareness of potential pesticide dangers, as well as Silent Spring book sales. Pesticide use became a major public issue, especially after the CBS Reports TV special The Silent Spring of Rachel Carson that aired April 3, 1963. The program included segments of Carson reading from Silent Spring and interviews with several other experts, mostly critics (including White-Stevens); according to biographer Linda Lear, "in juxtaposition to the wild-eyed, loud-voiced Dr. Robert White-Stevens in white lab coat, Carson appeared anything but the hysterical alarmist that her critics contended." Reactions from the estimated audience of ten to fifteen million were overwhelmingly positive, and the program spurred a congressional review of pesticide dangers and the public release of a pesticide report by the President's Science Advisory Committee. Within a year or so of publication, the attacks on the book and Carson had largely lost momentum.

In one of her last public appearances, Carson testified before President John F. Kennedy's Science Advisory Committee. The committee issued its report on May 15, 1963, largely backing Carson's scientific claims. Following the report's release, she also testified before a United States Senate subcommittee to make policy recommendations. Though Carson received hundreds of other speaking invitations, she could not accept the great majority of them. Her health was steadily declining as her cancer outpaced the radiation therapy, with only brief periods of remission. She spoke as much as she was physically able, however, including a notable appearance on The Today Show and speeches at several dinners held in her honor. In late 1963, she received a flurry of awards and honors: the Audubon Medal (from the National Audubon Society), the Cullum Geographical Medal (from the American Geographical Society), and induction into the American Academy of Arts and Letters.

== Writing style and effect ==
Rachel Carson's writing style includes scientific report blended with imagery and narrative, aiming to emotionally appeal to her readers, in an effort to motivate environmental activism. Carson utilizes grotesque imagery of the human body to reinforce the idea that humans are a part of nature. Another method she uses to reinforce human proximity to nature is creating sublimity within her writing. She uses natural imagery to demonstrate that humans are a small part of a much larger whole, deeming the environment as important as humans. These stylistic choices emphasize the interconnectedness of humans and nature and influence the reader to develop a sense of empathy for the environment, resulting in feelings of responsibility to preserve and protect the natural world.

== Personal life ==
Carson met Dorothy M. Freeman in the summer of 1953 on Southport Island, Maine. Freeman had written to Carson welcoming her to the area when she had heard that the famous author was to become her neighbor. It was the beginning of a devoted friendship that lasted the rest of Carson's life. Their relationship was conducted mainly through letters and during summers spent together in Maine. Over 12 years, they exchanged around 900 letters. Many of these were published in the book Always, Rachel, published in 1995 by Beacon Press.

Carson's biographer, Linda J. Lear, writes that "Carson sorely needed a devoted friend and kindred spirit who would listen to her without advising and accept her wholly, the writer as well as the woman." She found this in Freeman. The two women had common interests, nature chief among them, and began exchanging letters regularly while apart. They shared summers for the remainder of Carson's life and met whenever else their schedules permitted.

Concerning the depth of their relationship, commentators have said: "the expression of their love was limited almost wholly to letters and very occasional farewell kisses or holding of hands". Freeman shared parts of Carson's letters with her husband to help him understand the relationship, but much of their correspondence was carefully guarded. Some believe Freeman and Carson's relationship was romantic in nature. One of the letters from Carson to Freeman reads: "But, oh darling, I want to be with you so terribly that it hurts!", while in another, Freeman writes: "I love you beyond expression... My love is boundless as the Sea." Carson's last letter to Freeman before her death ends with: "Never forget, dear one, how deeply I have loved you all these years."

Shortly before Carson's death, she and Freeman destroyed hundreds of letters. The surviving correspondence was published in 1995 as Always, Rachel: The Letters of Rachel Carson and Dorothy Freeman, 1952–1964: An Intimate Portrait of a Remarkable Friendship, edited by Martha Freeman, Dorothy's granddaughter, who wrote at publication: "A few comments in early letters indicate that Rachel and Dorothy were initially cautious about the romantic tone and terminology of their correspondence. I believe this caution prompted their destruction of some letters within the first two years of their friendship..." According to one reviewer, the pair "fit Carolyn Heilbrun's characterization of a strong female friendship, where what matters is 'not whether friends are homosexual or heterosexual, lovers or not, but whether they share the wonderful energy of work in the public sphere.'"

According to her biographer, Linda Lear, there was a disagreement about the final arrangements for Rachel. Her brother, Robert Carson, insisted that her cremated remains be buried beside their mother in Maryland. This was against her wishes to be buried in Maine. In the end, a compromise was reached. Carson's wishes were carried out by an organizing committee, including her agent (Marie Rodell), her editor (Paul Brooks), and Dorothy Freeman. In the spring of 1964, Dorothy received half of Rachel's ashes in the mail sent to her by Robert Carson. In the summer of that year, Dorothy carried out Rachel's final wishes, scattering her ashes along the rocky shores of Sheepscot Bay in Maine.

== Death ==
Weakened from breast cancer and her treatment regimen, Carson became ill with a respiratory virus in January 1964. Her condition worsened, and in February, doctors found that she had severe anemia from her radiation treatments. In March, they discovered that the cancer had reached her liver. She died of a heart attack on April 14, 1964, in her home in Silver Spring, Maryland.

Her body was cremated, and some of her ashes were buried beside her mother at Parklawn Memorial Gardens in Rockville, Maryland. The rest were scattered along the coast of Squirrel Island near Sheepscot River in Maine.

== Legacy ==
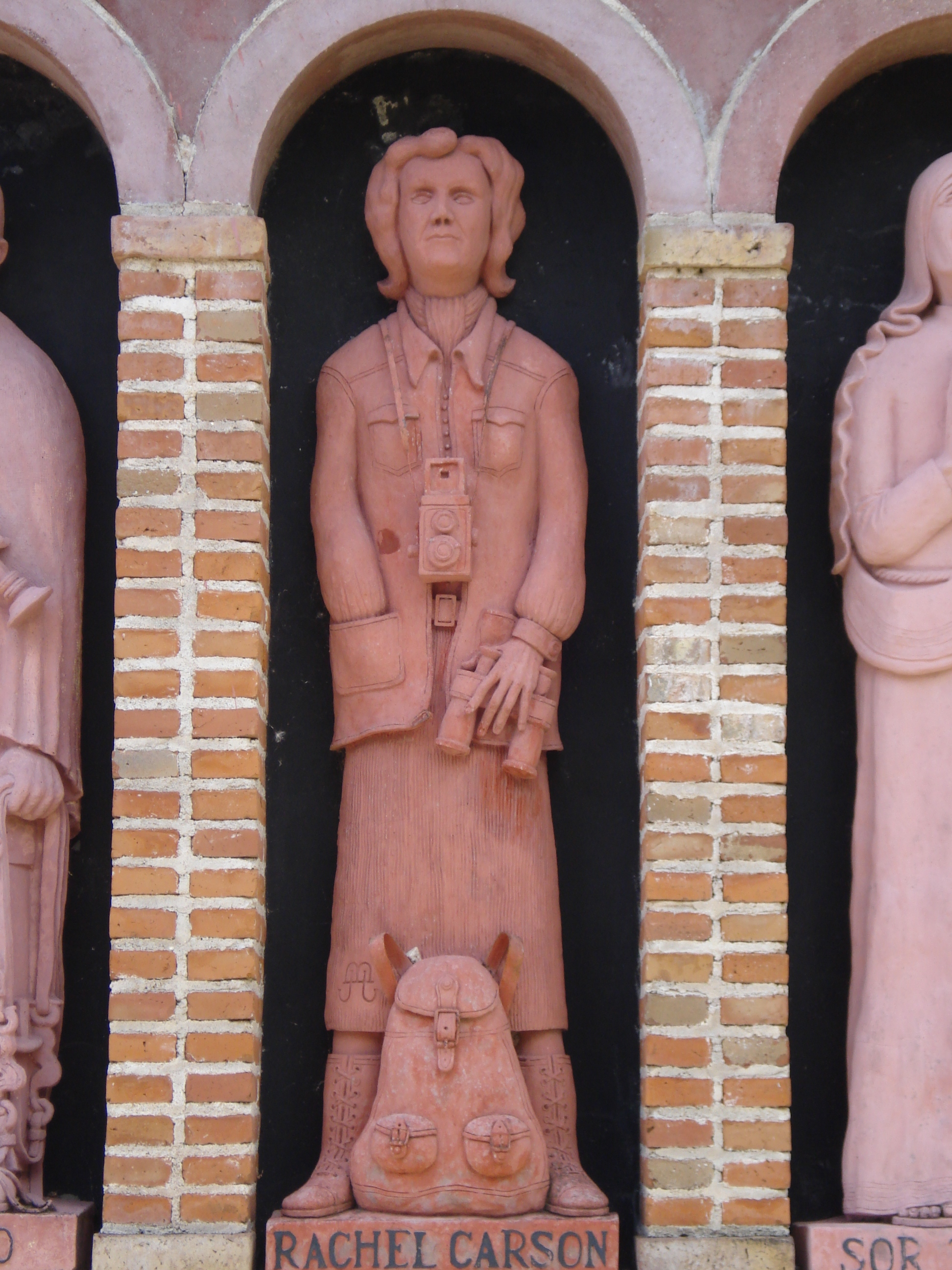
Statue of Carson at the Museo Rocsen in Nono, Córdoba, Argentina

=== Collected papers and posthumous publications ===
Carson bequeathed her manuscripts and papers to Yale University to take advantage of the new state-of-the-art preservations facilities of the Beinecke Rare Book & Manuscript Library. Her longtime agent and literary executor Marie Rodell spent nearly two years organizing and cataloging Carson's papers and correspondence, distributing all the letters to their senders so that only what each correspondent approved would be submitted to the archive.

In 1965, Rodell arranged for the publication of an essay Carson had intended to expand into a book: The Sense of Wonder. The essay, which was combined with photographs by Charles Pratt and others, exhorts parents to help their children experience the "...lasting pleasures of contact with the natural world ... available to anyone who will place himself under the influence of earth, sea, and sky and their amazing life."

In addition to the letters in Always Rachel, in 1998, a volume of Carson's previously unpublished work was published as Lost Woods: The Discovered Writing of Rachel Carson, edited by Linda Lear. All of Carson's books remain in print.

=== Grassroots environmentalism and the EPA ===
Carson's work had a powerful impact on the environmental movement. Silent Spring, in particular, was a rallying point for the fledgling social movement in the 1960s. According to environmental engineer and Carson scholar H. Patricia Hynes, "Silent Spring altered the balance of power in the world. No one since would be able to sell pollution as the necessary underside of progress so easily or uncritically." Carson's work, and the activism it inspired, are at least partly responsible for the deep ecology movement and the overall strength of the grassroots environmental movement since the 1960s. It was also influential on the rise of ecofeminism and on many feminist scientists.

While there remains no evidence that Carson was openly a women's rights activist, her work and its subsequent criticisms have left an iconic legacy for the ecofeminist movement. Attacks on Carson's credibility included criticism of her credentials in which she was labeled an "amateur." It was said that her writing was too "emotional." Ecofeminist scholars argue that not only was the dissenting rhetoric gendered to paint Carson as hysterical but was done because her arguments challenged the capitalist production of large agri-business corporations. Others, such as Yaakov Garb, suggest that in addition to not being a women's rights activist, Carson also had no anti-capitalist agenda and that such attacks were unwarranted. Additionally, the way photos of Carson were used to portray her are often questioned because of few representations of her engaging in work typical of a scientist, but instead of her leisure activities.

Carson's most direct legacy in the environmental movement was the campaign to ban DDT in the United States (and related efforts to ban or limit its use throughout the world). Though environmental concerns about DDT had been considered by government agencies as early as Carson's testimony before the President's Science Advisory Committee, the 1967 formation of the Environmental Defense Fund was the first significant milestone in the campaign against DDT. The organization brought lawsuits against the government to "establish a citizen's right to a clean environment," and the arguments employed against DDT largely mirrored Carson's. By 1972, the Environmental Defense Fund and other activist groups had succeeded in securing a phase-out of DDT use in the United States (except in emergency cases).

The creation of the Environmental Protection Agency (EPA) by the Nixon Administration in 1970 addressed another concern that Carson had brought to light. Until then, the same agency (the USDA) was responsible both for regulating pesticides and promoting the concerns of the agriculture industry; Carson saw this as a conflict of interest since the agency was not responsible for effects on wildlife or other environmental concerns beyond farm policy. Fifteen years after its creation, one journalist described the EPA as "the extended shadow of Silent Spring." Much of the agency's early work, such as enforcing the 1972 Federal Insecticide, Fungicide, and Rodenticide Act, was directly related to Carson's work.

In the 1980s, the policies of the Reagan Administration emphasized economic growth, rolling back many of the environmental policies adopted in response to Carson and her work.

=== Posthumous honors ===
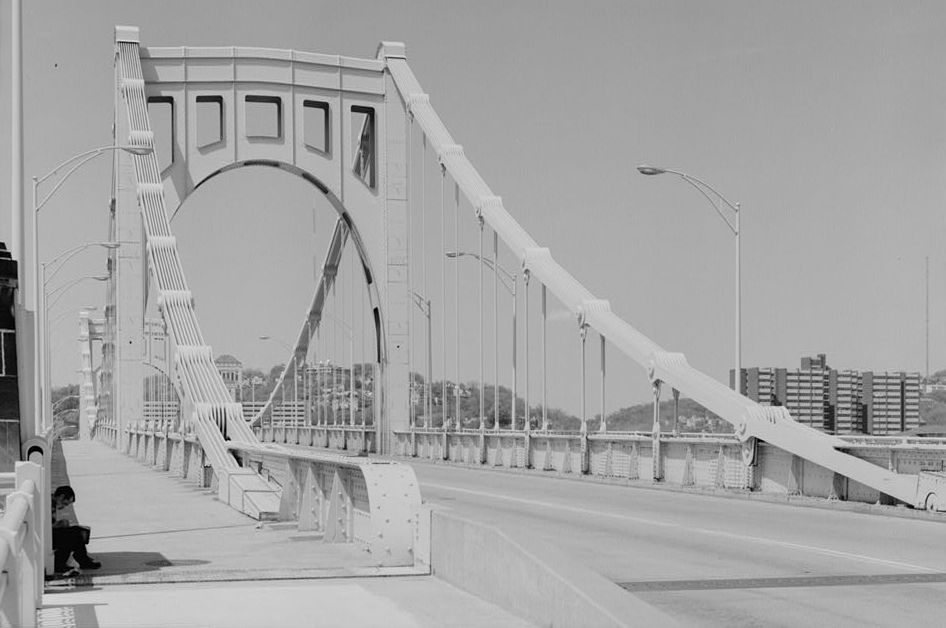
The Rachel Carson Bridge in Pittsburgh in 1999

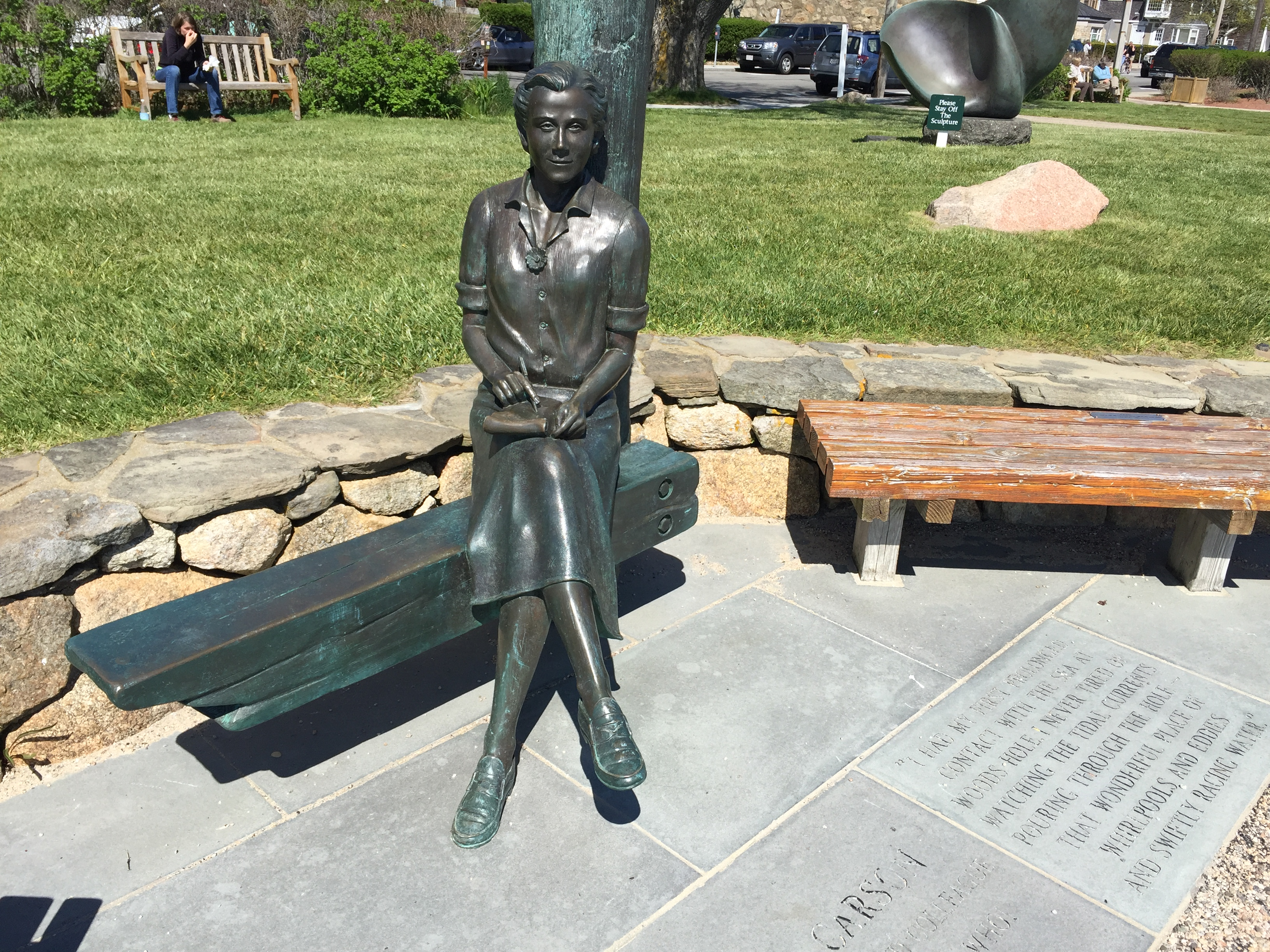
The statue of Rachel Carson in Woods Hole, Mass. in May 2016

Various groups ranging from government institutions to environmental and conservation organizations to scholarly societies have celebrated Carson's life and work since her death. Perhaps most significantly, on June 9, 1980, Carson was awarded the Presidential Medal of Freedom, the highest civilian honor in the United States. A 17¢ Great Americans series postage stamp was issued in her honor the following year; several other countries have since issued Carson postage as well. In 1973, Carson was inducted into the National Women's Hall of Fame.

The University of California, Santa Cruz, named one of its colleges, formerly known as College Eight, Rachel Carson College in 2016. Rachel Carson College is the first college at the university to bear a woman's name.

Munich's Rachel Carson Center for Environment and Society was founded in 2009. An international, interdisciplinary center for research and education in the environmental humanities and social sciences, it was established as a joint initiative of Munich's Ludwig-Maximilians-Universität and the Deutsches Museum, with the support of the German Federal Ministry of Education and Research.

Carson's birthplace and childhood home in Springdale, Pennsylvania, now known as the Rachel Carson Homestead, became a National Register of Historic Places site and the nonprofit Rachel Carson Homestead Association was created in 1975 to manage it. Her home in Colesville, Maryland, where she wrote Silent Spring, was named a National Historic Landmark in 1991. Near Pittsburgh, a 46.1 miles (74 km) hiking trail, the Rachel Carson Trail and maintained by the Rachel Carson Trails Conservancy, was dedicated to Carson in 1975. A Pittsburgh bridge was renamed in Carson's honor as the Rachel Carson Bridge. The Pennsylvania Department of Environmental Protection State Office Building in Harrisburg is named in her honor.

Elementary schools in Gaithersburg, Maryland, Sammamish, Washington and San Jose, California middle schools in Beaverton, Oregon Queens, New York City, Rachel Carson Intermediate School, in Herndon, Virginia, Rachel Carson Middle School, and a high school in Brooklyn, New York City were all named in her honor.

Two research vessels have sailed in the United States bearing the name R/V Rachel Carson. One is on the west coast, owned by Monterey Bay Aquarium Research Institute (MBARI), and the other is on the east coast, operated by the University of Maryland Center for Environmental Science. Another vessel of the name, now scrapped, was a former naval vessel obtained and converted by the United States EPA. It operated on the Great Lakes. The Florida Keys National Marine Sanctuary also operates a mooring buoy maintenance vessel named the Rachel Carson.

The ceremonial auditorium on the third floor of EPA headquarters, the William Jefferson Clinton Federal Building, is named after Carson. The Rachel Carson Room is close to the EPA Administrator's office. It has been the site of numerous important announcements, including the Clean Air Interstate Rule.

A number of conservation areas have been named for Carson as well. Between 1964 and 1990, 650 acres (263 ha) near Brookeville in Montgomery County, Maryland were acquired and set aside as the Rachel Carson Conservation Park, administered by the Maryland-National Capital Park and Planning Commission. In 1969, the Coastal Maine National Wildlife Refuge became the Rachel Carson National Wildlife Refuge; expansions will bring the size of the refuge to about 9,125 acres (3,693 ha). In 1985, North Carolina renamed one of its estuarine reserves in honor of Carson, in Beaufort.

Carson is also a frequent namesake for prizes awarded by philanthropic, educational and scholarly institutions. The Rachel Carson Prize, founded in Stavanger, Norway in 1991, is awarded to women who have made a contribution in the field of environmental protection. The American Society for Environmental History has awarded the Rachel Carson Prize for Best Dissertation since 1993. Since 1998, the Society for Social Studies of Science has awarded an annual Rachel Carson Book Prize for "a book length work of social or political relevance in the area of science and technology studies." The Society of Environmental Journalists gives an annual award and two honourable mentions for books on environmental issues in Carson's name, such as was awarded to Joe Roman's Listed: Dispatches from America's Endangered Species Act in 2012. The Sierra Club and its foundation recognize donors who have provided for the club in their estate plans as the Rachel Carson Society. The Rachel Carson Center for Environment and Society at Ludwig-Maximilians-Universität München (Germany) awards post-doctoral fellowships in the area of the environment and society.

The Rachel Carson sculpture in Woods Hole, Massachusetts was unveiled on July 14, 2013. Google created a Google Doodle for Carson's 107th birthday on May 27, 2014. Carson was featured during the "HerStory" video tribute to notable women on U2's tour in 2017 for the 30th anniversary of The Joshua Tree during a performance of "Ultraviolet (Light My Way)" from the band's 1991 album Achtung Baby. In 2019, Time created 89 new covers to celebrate women of the year starting from 1920; it chose Carson for 1963.

==== Centennial events ====
External videos
- Panel discussion on Rachel Carson's centennial with Roland Clement, Annick Smith, Stewart Udall, and Edward O. Wilson, June 2, 2007, C-SPAN

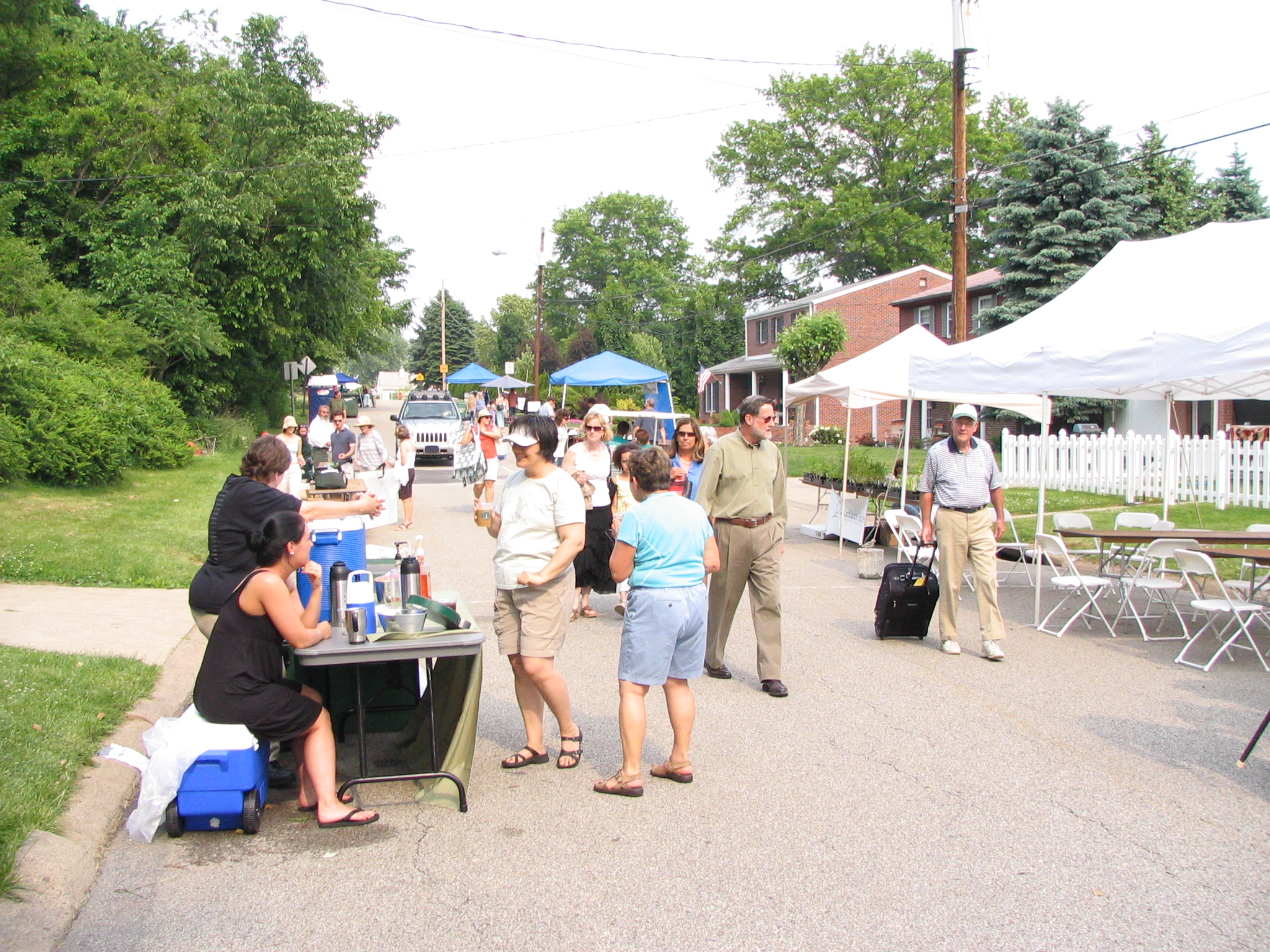
The celebration of the 100th anniversary of Carson's birth in May 2007 in Springdale, Pennsylvania

The centennial of Carson's birth occurred in 2007. On Earth Day (April 22), Courage for the Earth: Writers, Scientists, and Activists Celebrate the Life and Writing of Rachel Carson released as "a centennial appreciation of Rachel Carson's brave life and transformative writing." It included 13 essays by environmental writers and scientists.

Democratic Senator Benjamin L. Cardin of Maryland had intended to submit a resolution celebrating Carson for her "legacy of scientific rigor coupled with poetic sensibility" on the 100th anniversary of her birth. The resolution was blocked by Republican Senator Tom Coburn of Oklahoma.

On May 27, 2007, the Rachel Carson Homestead Association held a birthday party and sustainable feast at her birthplace and home in Springdale, Pennsylvania, and the first Rachel Carson Legacy Conference in Pittsburgh with E. O. Wilson as keynote speaker. Both Rachel's Sustainable Feast and the conference continue as annual events.

Also in 2007, American author Ginger Wadsworth wrote a biography of Carson.

== List of works ==
- Under the Sea Wind, 1941, Simon & Schuster, Penguin Group, 1996, ISBN 0-14-025380-7
- "Food From the Sea: Fish and Shellfish of New England" (PDF). US Fish & Wildlife Publications. United States Government Printing Office. 1943.
- Carson, Rachel (1943). "Food From Home Waters: Fishes of the Middle West" (PDF). US Fish & Wildlife Publications. United States Government Printing Office.
- "Fish and Shellfish of the South Atlantic and Gulf Coasts" (PDF). US Fish & Wildlife Publications. United States Government Printing Office. 1944.
- Carson, Rachel (1945). "Fish and Shellfish of the Middle Atlantic Coast" (PDF). US Fish & Wildlife Publications. United States Government Printing Office.
- Carson, Rachel (1947). "Chincoteague: A National Wildlife Refuge" (PDF). US Fish & Wildlife Publications. United States Government Printing Office.
- Carson, Rachel (1947). "Mattamuskeet: A National Wildlife Refuge" (PDF). US Fish & Wildlife Publications. United States Government Printing Office.
- Carson, Rachel (1947). "Parker River: A National Wildlife Refuge" (PDF). US Fish & Wildlife Publications. United States Government Printing Office.
- Wilson, Vanez; Carson, Rachel (1950). "Bear River: A National Wildlife Refuge" (PDF). US Fish & Wildlife Publications. United States Government Printing Office. (with Vanez T. Wilson)
- The Sea Around Us, Oxford University Press, 1951; Oxford University Press, 1991, ISBN 0-19-506997-8
- The Edge of the Sea, Houghton Mifflin 1955; Mariner Books, 1998, ISBN 0-395-92496-0
- Silent Spring, Houghton Mifflin, 1962; Mariner Books, 2002, ISBN 0-618-24906-0
  - Silent Spring initially appeared serialized in three parts in the June 16, June 23, and June 30, 1962, issues of The New Yorker magazine
- The Sense of Wonder, 1965, HarperCollins, 1998: ISBN 0-06-757520-X published posthumously
- Always, Rachel: The Letters of Rachel Carson and Dorothy Freeman 1952–1964 An Intimate Portrait of a Remarkable Friendship, Beacon Press, 1995, ISBN 0-8070-7010-6 edited by Martha Freeman (granddaughter of Dorothy Freeman)
- Lost Woods: The Discovered Writing of Rachel Carson, Beacon Press, 1998, ISBN 0-8070-8547-2
- Bedrock: Writers on the Wonders of Geology, edited by Lauret E. Savoy, Eldridge M. Moores, and Judith E. Moores, Trinity University Press, 2006, ISBN 1-59534-022-X

== See also ==
- Air pollution
- Environmentalist
- Environmental history of the United States
- Environmental toxicology
- Rachel Carson Greenway (three trails in Central Maryland)
- Silent Spring Institute
- Women and the environment
