= Edwin W. Taylor =

American biologist

- Education: University of Toronto (B.A., 1952); McMaster University (M.Sc. 1955); University of Chicago (Ph.D., 1957)
- Known for: Cytoskeletal research
- Awards: E.B. Wilson Medal (1999)
- Scientific career
- Fields: Molecular Genetics; Cell Biology; Biochemistry; Molecular Biology
- Workplaces: University of Chicago

Edwin W. Taylor is an adjunct professor of cell and developmental biology at Northwestern University. He was elected to the National Academy of Sciences in 2001. Taylor received a BA in physics and chemistry from the University of Toronto in 1952; an MSc in physical chemistry from McMaster University in 1955, and a PhD in biophysics from the University of Chicago in 1957. In 2001 Taylor was elected to the National Academy of Sciences in Cellular and Developmental Biology and Biochemistry.

Taylor has made contributions to the way muscles contract and other related cytoskeletal research. His research described the first kinetic model of how molecular motors are able to change chemical energy to mechanical force. He uncovered several molecular cell motors, including some that help certain white blood cells to move. He also elucidated how actin and myosin create movement in non-muscle cells. In 1950, Taylor, together with Gary Borisy who was a graduate student in Taylor's lab, discovered the protein that is the building block of microtubules, although the name of that protein, tubulin, was not coined until 1968. In 1967 Taylor found that the action of colchicine binding to cells could be modeled by a single kind of binding sites, perhaps showing that a unique target might exist. Taylor spends his summers in Woods Hole Research Center in Massachusetts.

== Education ==
In 1952, Taylor earned his Bachelor of Arts degree in Physics and Chemistry at the University of Toronto. He received a Master of Science degree from McMaster University in Physical Chemistry by 1955. During this same year, Taylor attended the University of Chicago, where he began his graduate studies in Biophysics and discovered an interest to research the mechanism of mitosis. His Ph.D. dissertation focused on measuring the rates of mitotic processes. He was able to assess spindles and their rate of growth through the application of polarized light microscopy. By 1957, he acquired his Ph.D. in Biophysics from the University of Chicago.

As a postdoctoral fellow, Taylor spent two years in the laboratory of Francis Schmitt at Massachusetts Institute of Technology, investigating the properties of neurofilament proteins with Peter Davison. He eventually returned to the University of Chicago and introduced his own laboratory. By the early 1970s, Taylor moved to the Medical Research Council Muscle Biophysics Unit at King’s College where he collaborated with Jean Hanson on a simple model of the muscle contraction cycle.

In 1999, Taylor spent some of his time in Gary Borisy’s laboratory at Northwestern University’s Department of Cell and Developmental Biology. While not in the laboratory, Taylor worked a half-time position as a Louis Block Professor of Molecular Genetics and Cell Biology at the University of Chicago.

== Research ==
Taylor focused a significant amount of his research on the molecular mechanisms regulating the movement of cells. His findings have contributed to a better understanding of the chemical events involved in muscle contraction cycles. Through the investigation of molecular motors, myosin with actin and kinesin with microtubules, Taylor was eager to discover the kinetic mechanism that dictated the structural changes responsible for force and motion. His work in the laboratory not only led to his discovery of tubulin, the protein subunit of microtubules, but it also developed the first kinetic model explaining how these molecular motors could convert chemical energy into mechanical force. To best understand the contraction cycle, the model was derived from striated muscle to study the kinetic mechanism of the actomyosin ATPase cycle. The main focus was to determine how the hydrolysis of ATP by enzymes could lead to the generation of force and motion. Nevertheless, a concern for Taylor stimulated from the very different reaction pathways that myosin and kinesin followed, considering the idea that these two motors shared very important structural features.

Taylor works on the molecular mechanisms regulating the movement of cells, particularly the chemical events involved in muscle contraction cycles. He investigates molecular motors, myosin with actin and kinesin with microtubules, to discover the kinetic mechanism that dictates the structural changes responsible for force and motion. This led to his discovery of tubulin, the protein subunit of microtubules, and to the first kinetic model explaining how these molecular motors convert chemical energy into mechanical force in striated muscle. In the actomyosin ATPase cycle, the hydrolysis of ATP by enzymes leads to the generation of force and motion. Taylor also has studied the very different reaction pathways that myosin and kinesin follow, showing that these two motors shared important structural features.

Taylor’s interest in studying mitotic mechanisms led to the use of colchicine. Its high affinity for binding to cells suggested the potential of isolating a complex of colchicine with its binding protein. Taylor and graduate student, Gary Borisy, discovered colchicine was indeed specific and its highest binding activity was presented in dividing cells, mitotic apparatus, cilia, sperm tails, and brain tissue.

In 1967, Borisy and Taylor published their work, “The Mechanism of Action of Colchicine. Binding of Colchincine-3H to Cellular Protein.” The goal of their project was to demonstrate that the 6S colchicine-binding protein is the subunit protein of microtubules. They observed that colchicine-binding activity had a significant correlation with sources abundant in microtubules, but an absence in correlation with mitotic activity or motility. Microtubules conduct the mitotic spindle, constitute the 9 + 2 assortment of filaments in the cilia and sperm tails, and participate in the majority of neuronal processes. As Taylor concluded the high colchicine binding activity in these four sources, the results made sense to him, considering microtubules are the only structure shared amongst the four.

Using sea urchin eggs, Taylor and Borisy directed another experiment to further demonstrate that the location of binding sites resides in the mitotic apparatus. When the spindles were extracted from the mitotic apparatus and suspended in treatment of low ionic strength, the microtubules disintegrated and disappeared. Under low ionic strength extraction, more than 80% of the colchicine-binding activity was removed, including the microtubules. As these conditions reduce the colchicine-binding activity, results conclude the absence of the microtubules.

After the introduction of tubulin, Taylor was conflicted on what moves the chromosomes and what caused the motile system to function. In the 1960s, myosin and dynein were the only structures potentially responsible. However, only dynein was able to interact with the microtubules. Taylor prioritized his focus on muscle actomyosin in order to fully understand the consequences in mechano-chemical coupling. By 1954, Hugh Huxley and Jean Hanson revealed their sliding filament model, proposing that through the contraction of a myosin molecule branch, myosin-actin linkages can pull the actin filament. The structural model provided clarity in contractility, but Taylor and other researchers remained unsure of the role of ATP hydrolysis. Aware that ATP was hydrolyzed in the polymerization of actin, Taylor was confused on whether it dissociated actomyosin through contraction or relaxation. In 1979, Taylor and his research partners demonstrated that the binding of myosin to actin, following the release of a phosphate, produced a significant reduction in free energy.

Once kinesin, a motor protein and anterograde transporter of vesicles in axons, was discovered, Taylor devoted his time to researching the kinetic mechanism. In 1995, Taylor and Yong-Ze Ma published, “Mechanism of Microtubule Kinesin ATPase”, noting that the dissociation of the K379 dimer in microtubule-kinesin occurred after the hydrolysis step, in comparison to the dissociation occurring before hydrolysis in the actomyosin mechanism. This sparked a realization in Taylor that the dissimilarities shared between the two mechanisms may indicate that a different step in the cycle may be coupled to force generation. He found the dissociation of phosphate in the actomyosin mechanism to be a slow rate-limiting step, while this step occurred relatively quickly for the kinesin-microtubule mechanism. The limiting rate is governed by the rate that ADP in the hydrolysis cycle dissociates. Additionally, Taylor and Richard Lymn concluded in 1971 that actomyosin ATPase’s slow rate-limiting step could be attributed to the rate-limiting dissociation of the products, ADP, and phosphate from the enzyme. This led to the idea that actin could be a potential influence in the rate of product dissociation instead of the hydrolytic step in its activation mechanism. Muscle myosin and kinesin have two head domains. As ATP binds to one head domain, it initiates the release of ADP from the second head domain in the hydrolysis cycle.

Taylor and fellow corresponding authors, Yvonne S. Aratyn, Thomas E. Schaus, and Gary G. Borisy, published the “Intrinsic Dynamic Behavior of Fascin in Filopodia” in 2007. Fascin is actin’s primary cross-linking protein in filopodial filaments, which are cellular projections that aid in the motility of cells. Results of their study showed that bundling in filopodial filaments requires the dephosphorylation of fascin, which can also initiate high-affinity actin binding in the filopodia. In order for filopodial filaments to form, the process depends on the phosphorylation or dephosphorylation cycles that serve as the primary indicators of fascin inactivity or activity.

Even twelve years later, what continued to remain misunderstood were the varying degrees of thin filament activation between pre- or post-power stroke myosin. Myosin’s kinetic properties had remained vague, and many techniques had been employed to further investigate what was left unknown. One of these techniques actually was instigated by Taylor and B. Finlayson in 1969 through the proton release. In 1987, S. Rosenfeld and Taylor evaluated the regulatory mechanism of actin-sub fragment 1 nucleoside triphosphate. They were interested in the influence that calcium binding to regulated actin has on ATPase cycle rates. For the hydrolysis step, there was only a small change in the presence of calcium. On the other hand, for the dissociation of the ligand and products, the presence of calcium for ATP led to an increased rate by 10-20-fold. These results showed Rosenfeld and Taylor that the particular steps in the ATPase cycle that were most impacted by the presence of calcium were the transition steps, followed by the dissociation of the ligand from the active site.

The actomyosin ATP hydrolysis cycle in muscle motility was intended to show a direct correlation in the regulation of ATP hydrolysis and the power stroke. However, experiments that exhibited an absence of ATP hydrolysis could not explain regulation. In “Investigation into the mechanism of thin filament regulation by transient kinetics and equilibrium binding: Is there a conflict?”, Taylor, along with David H. Heely and Howard D. White conduct research and provide more clarity to the issue. In their research, they confirm that the thin filament activity is primarily influenced by the rate of inorganic phosphate dissociation. In addition, they observed that the regulatory focal point of the thin filament, or the step that releases the inorganic phosphate, is dependent upon myosin’s conformation, as well as the bonded state of the thin filament.

== Awards and honors ==
Published on March 4, 1999, The University of Chicago Chronicle writes about the honoring of Taylor at the National Institutes of Health in Bethesda, Maryland, with a science symposium. The symposium is titled as "Myosin, Microtubules and Motion" to acknowledge Taylor's contributions and efforts towards these particular fields. On May 1, 2001, Taylor was elected Member of the National Academy of Sciences. He was elected for his crucial contributions to the biochemistry of muscle contraction. Taylor is recognized as the "father of cytoskeletal research".
