= The Forsyth Institute =

Craniofacial research institute

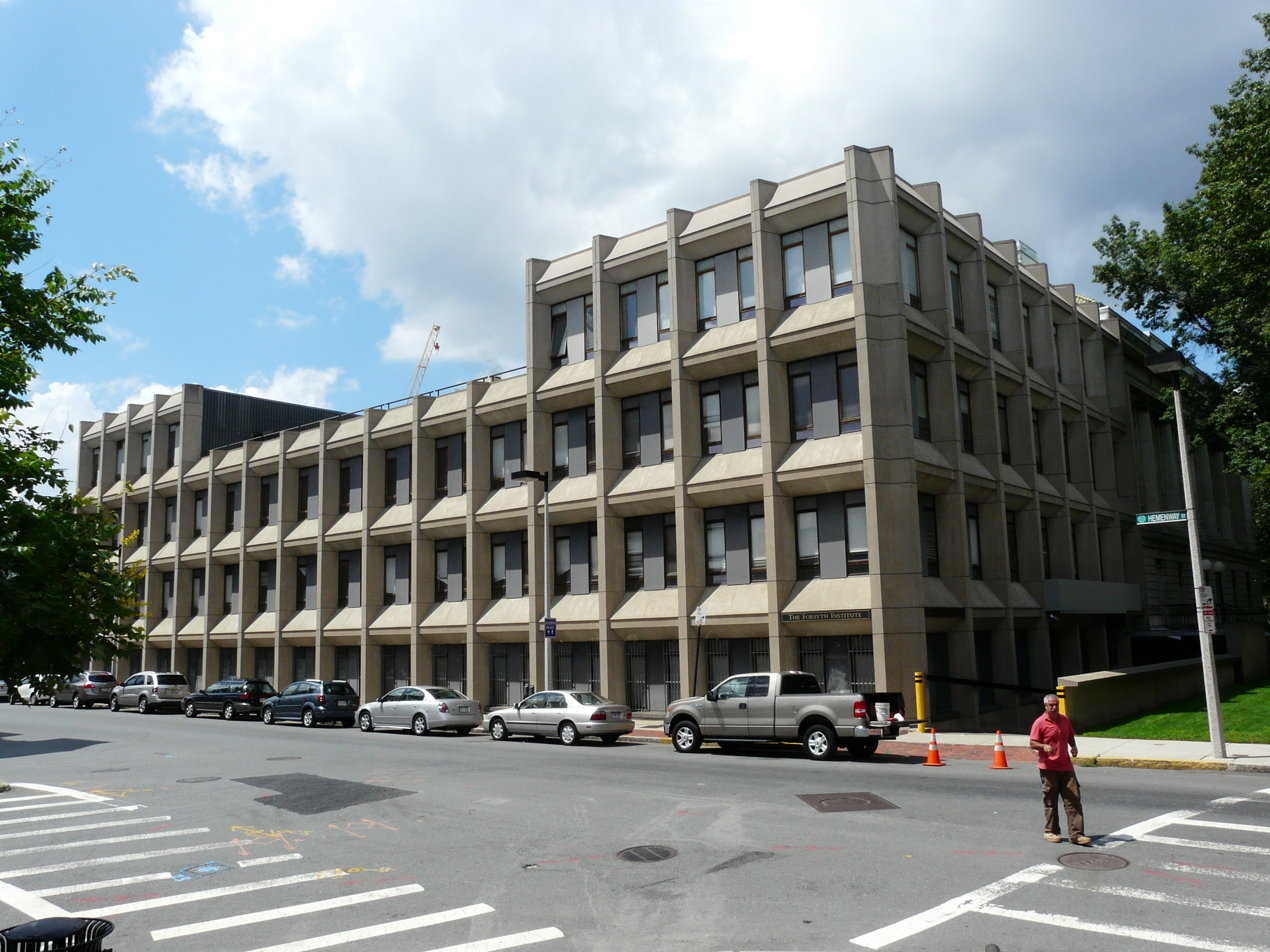
The original location of the institute at 140 The Fenway

The Forsyth Institute, located in Somerville, Massachusetts, is one of the leading centers for dental and craniofacial research in the world. It was envisioned in 1908 by James Forsyth, who left $500,000 in his will for the establishment of a dental infirmary for poor children in Boston. Forsyth would pass away before establishing the institute leaving his two brothers, Dr. Thomas Alexander Forsyth And John Forsyth, the task of establishing the dental infirmary.

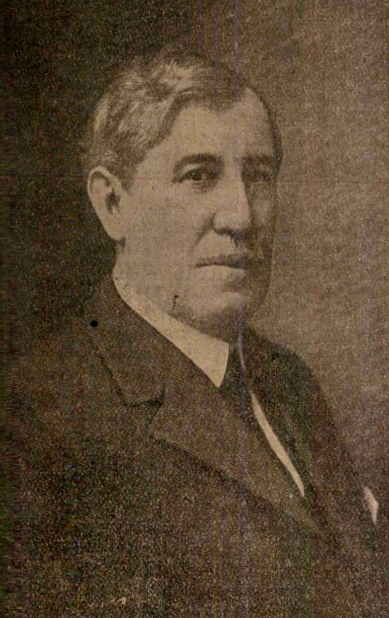
T. A. Forsyth

The institute was once an infirmary for pediatric dental care in Boston. The Forsyth Dental Infirmary for Children was founded in 1914 by Dr. Thomas Alexander Forsyth and John Hamilton Forsyth in memory of their brothers, George Henry Forsyth and James Bennett Forsyth.

It had been located for over a century in the Fenway–Kenmore area of Boston, at 140 The Fenway (Fenway Street), next to the Museum of Fine Arts. The museum acquired the institute's Fenway property prior to Forsyth's move to Cambridge in 2010. The new Forsyth headquarters in Cambridge was designed by the architectural firm ARC/Architectural Resources Cambridge, Inc.

The Forsyth Institute is affiliated with the Harvard School of Dental Medicine, and also collaborates with many other institutions worldwide. In 2016, the Forsyth Entrepreneurial Science Center was opened at its headquarters at 245 First Street. The shared-space startup business incubator was initially planned to occupy about 5,000 square feet (460 m^{2}) within Forsyth’s 70,000-square-foot (6,500 m^{2}) headquarters space.

The Institute continues to provide pediatric dental care, setting up temporary ForsythKids clinics across Massachusetts. In October 2023, Forsyth announced it would be merging with the research arm of the American Dental Association to form the ADA Forsyth Institute, retaining its existing headquarters and CEO.
