= Silent Spring Institute =

Non-profit breast cancer organization

Silent Spring Institute is a 501(c)(3) nonprofit organization and independent scientific research institute based in Newton, Massachusetts. It is one of the nation’s leading authorities on environmental chemicals and cancer, with particular expertise in breast cancer and preventable risk factors. The institute’s research spans other women's health-related topics as well.

The institute was named in honor of environmentalist Rachel Carson, author of the seminal 1962 book Silent Spring, who died of breast cancer.

== History and Purpose ==
The nonprofit organization was founded in 1994 by the Massachusetts Breast Cancer Coalition, which called for a scientific investigation after the Massachusetts Department of Public Health released a study showing cancer rates by town were elevated for eleven of fifteen Cape Cod towns. The institute formed as a result of this investigation by prioritizing the environmental links to disease burdens. Its scientific team has done field testing on Cape Cod and collaborates with private and academic laboratories. A study by researchers at the institute, published in 2004, showed that the longer that women lived on Cape Cod, the higher was their breast cancer risk. In 2014, the Cape Cod Times recalled that:

From the start, Silent Spring Institute researchers were interested in whether environmental toxins were having a particular influence on the Cape's drinking water, which is served by a sole source aquifer and leaches through sandy soil that in theory allows wastewater – and contaminants – to drain into the water supply more quickly than through other types of soil. Silent Spring researchers have tested water in public and private wells for the presence of chemicals known as emerging contaminants and have visited scores of Cape homes to measure for the presence of hormone-disrupting chemicals.

The organization has demonstrated various forms of thought leadership in the field of environmental public health. For example, the institute established a Pathway to Prevention – which calls for removal of toxic chemicals from food, water, air, and consumer products. The model takes scientific research conducted by the organization and other leading research groups and translates it into action with the goal of prevention.

== Research ==
=== Background ===
The only independent research institute dedicated to studying breast cancer prevention, Silent Spring Institute has established a reputation for exemplary research. In keeping with Silent Spring's commitment to collaboration between scientists and activists, researchers report individual exposure results to all individuals and communities participating in its studies. The institute has become a pioneer in developing ethical methods for communicating results when the health implications are uncertain. In 2000, Silent Spring's research was honored with a U.S. Environmental Protection Agency Environmental Merit Award.

Silent Spring Institute states their research “produce[s] new knowledge about the health risks associated with cancer-causing chemicals where we live, work, and play,” and they “[develop] new technologies and methods for reducing exposures to hazardous chemicals and helping manufacturers create safer products.” The organization’s core values are 1) prioritizing prevention, 2) focusing on women’s health, 3) supporting communities, and 4) pursuing environmental justice.

The research papers of Silent Spring Institute from 1988 to 2006 are archived at the Schlesinger Library at Harvard, which has prepared a detailed finding aid.

=== Projects ===
Research on Per- and Polyfluoroalkyl Substances (PFAS)

Silent Spring scientists first detected PFAS in public drinking water supplies on Cape Cod in 2009. Since then, Silent Spring Institute has become a leading authority on PFAS in drinking water. For example, in 2019, Silent Spring launched the Massachusetts PFAS & Your Health Study, one of seven projects that form the CDC/ASTD Multi-Site Study, to investigate the health impacts of PFAS. The Massachusetts PFAS & Your Health Study is investigating two communities, Ayer and Hyannis, where the drinking water has been contaminated by PFAS from the use of firefighting foams.

To help communities impacted by contamination, Silent Spring and its partners created the PFAS Exchange – an online resource with information on reducing exposures and medical guidance for clinicians. Silent Spring also works upstream to help restrict the use of PFAS in consumer products. For example, in 2017, the institute showed that PFAS are widespread in U.S. food packaging. This then led to several state bans on the use of PFAS in food packaging. Likewise, in 2019, the institute’s scientists published a study in which they found PFAS in dental floss, including Oral-B Glide. In 2025, the company posted on its website that it no longer uses PFAS in its products.

Silent Spring Institute's Safer Chemicals Program

Through Silent Spring Institute’s Safer Chemical Program, launched in 2018, researchers are working to identify the mechanisms by which chemicals may cause breast cancer. Their goal is to strengthen how chemicals are tested for safety before they are put into products. In 2024, a landmark study by Silent Spring identified 921 chemicals that could influence the development of breast cancer by activating biological pathways that are key characteristics of breast carcinogens. The research showed that half of these chemicals cause cells to make more estrogen and progesterone. A subsequent study by the team found that 414 of these chemicals are used in plastics.

Report on Phosphate Flame Retardants Exposure (2014)

Researchers from the institute and from the University of Antwerp, Belgium, reported that there had been "limited information" about Americans' exposure to phosphate flame retardants and how such exposure might affect their health, so in 2011 a urine analysis and study was made of sixteen California residents, and all were found to have traces of three harmful chemicals – bis-(1,3-dichloro-2-propyl) phosphate (BDCIPP), tris-(1,3-dichloro-isopropyl) phosphate (TDCIPP) and bis-(2-chloroethyl) phosphate (BCEP).

The lead researcher, from Silent Spring, Robin Dodson, said: "We found that several toxic flame retardants are in people's bodies. When you sit on your couch, you want to relax, not get exposed to chemicals that may cause cancer.” Medical News Today said that "Flame retardant chemicals are found in a variety of products that we come into contact with every day, such as carpets, sofas, curtains and even baby products. The chemicals were introduced to these products in the 1970s to reduce the likelihood of ignitability." It noted that another chemical, tris-(2-chloroethyl) phosphate (TCEP), "known to cause cancer and reproductive problems in humans," was found in about 75% if the subjects and that it had "never before been discovered in Americans." Counsel and Health noted that "The team also found that residents with the highest levels of TCEP and TDCIPP in their urine lived in homes that had respective chemical in dust, which suggests that the home and the furniture in it are exposing people to toxic flame retardants."

Medical News Today concluded:

The researchers note that there are strategies consumers can adopt to reduce their exposure to toxic flame retardants. Because the chemicals are likely to gather in dust, they recommend that individuals use a vacuum with a high-efficiency particulate air (HEPA) filter to vacuum their homes. This filter traps particles, rather than recirculate them back into the air. They also recommend that people throw away any foam that is deteriorating in their households, as it is possible such products may emit higher levels of toxic chemicals.

The study was published in the journal Environmental Science & Technology.

Study Identifying Breast Carcinogens (2014)

The institute published a paper in Environmental Health Perspectives that listed "17 types of chemicals to avoid, including those in gasoline, diesel exhaust, flame retardants, and paint thinner." The study showed breast carcinogens with widespread exposure and identified methods to measure them in people, providing a road map for breast cancer research and policies to reduce exposure.

The authors of the study were Ruthann A. Rudel, Janet M. Ackerman and Julia Green Brody of the Silent Spring Institute and Kathleen R. Attfield of the Harvard School of Public Health. United Press International summed up its results by stating: "Gasoline and chemicals formed by combustion from vehicles, lawn equipment, smoking and charred food are among the largest sources of mammary carcinogens in the environment." In detail, these carcinogens included:

Solvents, such as methylene chloride and other halogenated organic solvents used in spot removers, specialty cleaners and industrial degreasers. Pharmaceutical hormones such as hormone replacement therapy; certain flame retardants used in furniture; a chemical used in stain-resistant textiles and non-stick coatings; and styrene found in tobacco smoke and also used to make Styrofoam. Drinking water was another source as it can contain mammary carcinogens, such disinfection by-products or solvents.

Study on Septic System Contaminants on Cape Cod (2013)

Laurel Schaider, a scientist at the Silent Spring Institute, published a study in the Science of the Total Environment journal that "looked at emerging contaminants in septic systems" on Cape Cod and their impact on water wells. It found that "caffeine and acetaminophen were very well removed" by sewage treatment but "not so well removed were antibiotic containing sulfa, and PFOS, a chlorinated flame retardant commonly used in a number of home stain-resistant and nonstick coatings, as well as firefighting foams." It was "estimated that 80–85 percent of nitrogen comes from human waste not being properly processed via the Cape’s septic systems."

Study on Chemicals In Household Products (2012)

A study by the institute found that a test of 50 household products such as cleaners, cosmetics and personal-care products found a "troubling amount" of "potentially harmful" chemicals. Julia Brody of the institute advised consumers to avoid "antimicrobial products like some hand sanitizers and soaps" and "many products that contain fragrances." According to a television news report, "Silent Spring says look for 'paraben-free' products when shopping for deodorant, shampoo or cosmetics, and avoid vinyl products especially pillow and mattress protectors. The problem, the study finds, is that manufacturers are not required to list all ingredients."

== Other activities ==
Silent Spring Institute hosts an annual Gala Celebration in Boston, Massachusetts. In 2024, the institute celebrated their 30th anniversary at the Museum of Science featuring actor and activist Mark Ruffalo, investigative journalist, Sharon Lerner, executive director of the institute, Mary Beth Terry, and a performance by Mistral. Each year, the institute presents the Rachel Carson Advocacy Award, which is given to an individual advocating for a safer environment and advancing protections for public health. Past recipients of the Rachel Carson Advocacy Award include:

2024: Mark Ruffalo, actor and PFAS activist

2021: Mass Governor Maura Healey (then Attorney General of Massachusetts)

2020: Rachel Morello-Frosch, environmental justice champion at UC Berkeley

2015: the late Dr. Jack Erban, breast oncologist at Tufts Medical Center and long-time SSI board member

== Leadership ==
Julia Brody, a nationally recognized leader on environmental chemicals and breast cancer, served as the Silent Spring Institute’s Executive Director from 1996 to 2024. Mary Beth Terry, an internationally renowned cancer epidemiologist from Columbia University's Mailman School of Public Health, was named the new Executive Director in July 2024. Ruthann Rudel is the Institute’s Director of Research and has worked at the Institute shortly after the organization’s inception. Throughout her time working for the Institute, Rudel has led several critical studies investigating potential breast carcinogens, exposure mechanisms to endocrine disrupting chemicals, and risk assessments.

Silent Spring Institute has a Board of Directors with sixteen members who span professional fields including business, academia, communications, finance, and medicine.

== Funding ==
Silent Spring Institute was founded with funding from the state of Massachusetts, in which the institute received $8.5 million over the span of seven years. The organization has since expanded, obtaining competitive federal grants including from the National Institutes of Health (NIH), US Environmental Protection Agency (EPA), the US Department of Housing and Urban Development (HUD), and Center for Disease Control and Prevention (CDC). Projects at the Institute have also received funding from state grants including the California Breast Cancer Research Program. In addition to state and federal funding, the Institute has received grants from foundations as well as funds from individual charitable donations.
