= Paul Brooks (writer) =

American writer and environmentalist

Paul Brooks (1909–1998) was a nature writer, book editor, and environmentalist.

Brooks received his bachelor's degree from Harvard University in 1931, where he was the editor of the Harvard Lampoon. Soon after graduation, he became an employee at the publishing company Houghton Mifflin in Boston and remained with the company for 40 years. He was editor-in-chief of Houghton Mifflin's General Book Department from 1943 until his retirement in 1969. He wrote Two Park Street: A Publishing Memoir, containing anecdotes about his experiences editing the works of Rachel Carson, Roger Tory Peterson, Winston Churchill, Arthur Schlesinger Jr., and James Agee, among others. Paul Brooks suggested the title Silent Spring for Rachel Carson's famous book.

In 1965 Brooks won the John Burroughs Medal for his 1964 book Roadless Area.

== Books ==
- Roadless Area. New York: Knopf. 1964; 259 pages
- The Pursuit of Wilderness. Houghton Mifflin. 1971. ISBN 9780395120934; 220 pages
- The House of Life: Rachel Carson at Work. Boston: G. K. Hall. 1972.
- The View from Lincoln Hill: Man and the Land in a New England Town. Houghton Mifflin. 1976. ISBN 9780395243985; 273 pages
- Speaking for Nature: How Literary Naturalists from Henry Thoreau to Rachel Carson Have Shaped America. Houghton Mifflin. 1980. ISBN 9780395296103.
- The Old Manse and the People Who Lived There. Trustees of Reservations, The Old Manse, Concord, Massachusetts. 1983.
- Two Park Street: a Publishing Memoir. Houghton Mifflin Harcourt. 1986. ISBN 9780395377741; 157 pages
- The People of Concord: One Year in the Flowering of New England. Chester, Connecticut: Globe Pequot Press. 1990. ISBN 9780871064349. Brooks, Paul (2014). Dover reprint. Courier Corporation. ISBN 9780486781433; pbk, 304 pages
