= Gary Borisy =

American biologist

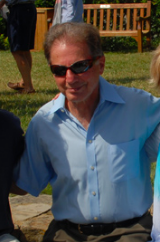
- Education: University of Chicago
- Scientific career
- Workplaces: University of Wisconsin; Northwestern University; Marine Biological Laboratory, Massachusetts; Forsyth Institute

Gary G. Borisy is a retired president and director of the Marine Biological Laboratory in Woods Hole, Massachusetts. In 2013, Borisy joined the Department of Microbiology at the Forsyth Institute.

Borisy received his BS in biochemistry (1962) and Ph.D. in biophysics (1966) under Edwin Taylor from the University of Chicago, characterizing tubulin and its role in cell division. He then did a postdoc at the Medical Research Council Laboratory of Molecular Biology in Cambridge, England under Hugh Huxley.

He spent 32 years on faculty at the University of Wisconsin-Madison as a faculty member studying the cytoskeleton, becoming a professor in 1968 and chair of Molecular Biology from 1980 to 2000. In 2000, he moved to Northwestern University Feinberg School of Medicine where he was the Leslie B. Arey professor of cell and molecular biology, distinguished investigator in the Feinberg Cardiovascular Research Institute, and associate vice president for biomedical research. He was named CEO and director of the Marine Biological Laboratory in 2006, and retired in 2012 at age 70.

Borisy was President of the American Society for Cell Biology in 2011 and is a recipient of numerous awards including an NIH MERIT Award, the Carl Zeiss Award from the German Society for Cell Biology, and the Distinguished Alumni Award of the University of Chicago. He is an elected member of the National Academy of Sciences and the American Academy of Arts and Sciences.

Borisy has 3 children, Felice, a neurobiologist turned lawyer, Pippa, a musician, and Alexis, a biotech CEO.
