= Federal Duck Stamp =

Stamps sold for wetland conservation

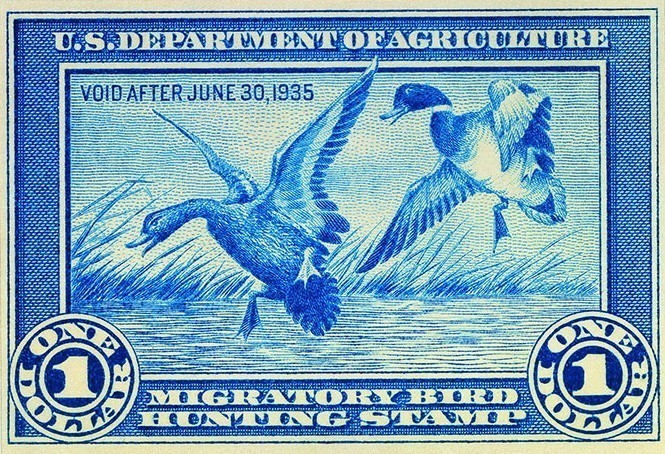
The first United States duck stamp, issued August 14, 1934

The Federal Duck Stamp, formally known as the Migratory Bird Hunting and Conservation Stamp, is an adhesive stamp issued by the United States Department of the Interior that must be purchased prior to any waterfowl hunting. It is also used to gain entrance to National Wildlife Refuges that normally charge for admission. It is widely seen as a collectable and a means to raise funds for wetland conservation.

Duck stamps are issued by the United States government and all state governments. Many other countries, including Canada, Australia, Mexico, Russia and the United Kingdom have also issued duck stamps.

== Overview ==
President Herbert Hoover signed the Migratory Bird Conservation Act in 1929 to authorize the acquisition and preservation of wetlands as waterfowl habitat. The law, however, did not provide a permanent source of money to buy and conserve the wetlands. On March 16, 1934, Congress passed, and President Franklin D. Roosevelt signed, the Migratory Bird Hunting and Conservation Stamp Act, popularly known as the Duck Stamp Act. Funds raised from sales of duck stamps go to the Migratory Bird Conservation Fund. As of 2024, it has been used to purchase or lease more than 2,600,000 acres (1,100,000 ha; 4,100 sq mi) at 264 national wildlife refuges. Duck stamps are issued each year, valid from July 1 to the following June 30. The annual federal duck stamp had a face value of $1 in 1934, jumped to $2 in 1949, and to $3 in 1959; it is now $25.

The first Federal Duck Stamp, designed by Jay Norwood Darling in 1934 at President Franklin D. Roosevelt's request, depicts two mallards about to land on a marsh pond. In subsequent years, other noted wildlife artists were asked to submit designs. In 1949, the first duck stamp contest was opened to the public.

In most states, hunters are required to purchase both a federal and state stamp before hunting waterfowl. Funds generated from state stamps are designated for wetlands restoration and preservation, much like the federal funds, but with a more localized purpose. About 10 states issue two types of stamps, one for collectors and another for hunter use. Collector stamps are usually in panes of 10 or 30 without tabs. Hunter type stamps are usually issued in panes of five or 10, many with tabs attached. Governor's editions have been issued by several state agencies as a means of raising additional income. They have a face value of approximately $50, and are imprinted with the name of the state governor. Governors also hand-sign a limited number of stamps.

== Duck stamp contest ==
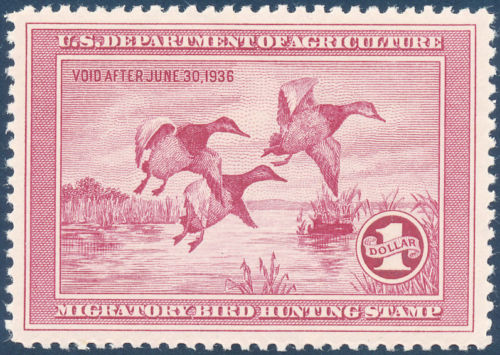
Mallards on stamp from 1935.

The first contest in 1949 was open to any U.S. artist who wished to enter. Sixty-five artists submitted 88 design entries that first year. The number of entries rose to 2,099 in 1981. Maynard Reece from Arnolds Park, Iowa, won the competition a record five times, winning in 1948, 1951, 1959, 1969 and 1971. Brothers Joe and Jim Hautman have individually surpassed Reece's record with six and seven wins respectively. Each year, prospective contestants are provided with a list of eligible species to choose as their subject. The eligible species for the 2024 contest were Brant, Northern Shoveler, Greater Scaup, Spectacled Eider, and Hooded Merganser.

== List of duck stamps ==
Federal Duck Stamp artists and featured species
| Permit Year | Face Value | Species featured | Artist | Notes |
|---|---|---|---|---|
| 1934 | $1.00 | Mallard | Jay Norwood "Ding" Darling | Founded the National Wildlife Federation two years later in 1936 |
| 1935 | $1.00 | Canvasback | Frank W. Benson | |
| 1936 | $1.00 | Canada goose | Richard E. Bishop | |
| 1937 | $1.00 | Greater scaup | Joseph D. Knap (1875–1962) | |
| 1938 | $1.00 | Northern pintail | Roland H. Clark | |
| 1939 | $1.00 | Green-winged teal | Lynn Bogue Hunt (1878–1960) | |
| 1940 | $1.00 | American black duck | Francis L. Jacques | |
| 1941 | $1.00 | Ruddy duck | Edwin R. Kalmbach | |
| 1942 | $1.00 | American wigeon | Aiden Lassel Ripley (1896–1969) | |
| 1943 | $1.00 | Wood duck | Walter E. Bohl (1907–1990) | |
| 1944 | $1.00 | Greater white-fronted goose | Walter A. Weber | |
| 1945 | $1.00 | Northern shoveler | Owen J. Gromme (1896–1991) | |
| 1946 | $1.00 | Redhead | Robert W. "Bob" Hines | |
| 1947 | $1.00 | Snow goose | Jack Murray (1889–1965) | |
| 1948 | $1.00 | Bufflehead | Maynard Reece | |
| 1949 | $2.00 | Common goldeneye | Roger E. Preuss (1922–2007) | |
| 1950 | $2.00 | Trumpeter swan | Walter A. Weber | First design chosen by public contest |
| 1951 | $2.00 | Gadwall | Maynard Reece | |
| 1952 | $2.00 | Harlequin duck | John H. Dick | |
| 1953 | $2.00 | Blue-winged teal | Clayton B. Seagears (1897–1983) | |
| 1954 | $2.00 | Ring-necked duck | Harvey Dean Sandstrom (1925–2013) | |
| 1955 | $2.00 | Blue goose | Stanley Stearns (1926–2013) | |
| 1956 | $2.00 | Common merganser | Edward J. Bierly (1920–2004) | |
| 1957 | $2.00 | Common eider | Jackson Miles Abbott | |
| 1958 | $2.00 | Canada goose | Leslie C. Kouba | |
| 1959 | $3.00 | Mallard | Maynard Reece | First multi-color design (black, blue, and yellow) |
| 1960 | $3.00 | Redhead | John A. Ruthven | |
| 1961 | $3.00 | Mallard | Edward A. Morris (1917–2009) | |
| 1962 | $3.00 | Northern pintail | Edward A. Morris | |
| 1963 | $3.00 | Brant | Edward J. Bierly | |
| 1964 | $3.00 | Nene | Stanley Stearns | |
| 1965 | $3.00 | Canvasback | Ron Jenkins (1932– ) | |
| 1966 | $3.00 | Tundra swan | Stanley Stearns | |
| 1967 | $3.00 | Long-tailed duck | Leslie C. Kouba | |
| 1968 | $3.00 | Hooded merganser | Claremont Gale Pritchard (1910–1975) | |
| 1969 | $3.00 | White-winged scoter | Maynard Reece | |
| 1970 | $3.00 | Ross's goose | Edward J. Bierly | First intaglio/offset printed Stamp |
| 1971 | $3.00 | Cinnamon teal | Maynard Reece | |
| 1972 | $5.00 | Emperor goose | Arthur M. Cook (1931–1993) | |
| 1973 | $5.00 | Steller's eider | Lee LeBlanc (1913–1988) | |
| 1974 | $5.00 | Wood duck | David A. Maass (1929– ) | |
| 1975 | $5.00 | Canvasback | James P. Fisher (1912–1990) | |
| 1976 | $5.00 | Canada goose | Alderson Magee (1929– ) | |
| 1977 | $5.00 | Ross's goose | Martin R. Murk (1928– ) | |
| 1978 | $5.00 | Hooded merganser | Albert Earl Gilbert (1939– ) | |
| 1979 | $7.50 | Green-winged teal | Lawrence K. "Ken" Michaelsen (1936– ) | |
| 1980 | $7.50 | Mallard | Richard W. Plasschaert (1941– ) | |
| 1981 | $7.50 | Ruddy duck | John S. Wilson (1939– ) | |
| 1982 | $7.50 | Canvasback | David A. Maass | |
| 1983 | $7.50 | Northern pintail | Phil V. Scholer (1951– ) | |
| 1984 | $7.50 | American wigeon | William C. Morris (1945– ) | 50th anniversary |
| 1985 | $7.50 | Cinnamon teal | Gerald Mobley (1938– ) | |
| 1986 | $7.50 | Fulvous whistling duck | Burton E. Moore, Jr. (1935– ) | |
| 1987 | $10.00 | Redhead | Arthur G. Anderson (1935– ) | First printing from intaglio sleeve |
| 1988 | $10.00 | Snow goose | Daniel Smith | |
| 1989 | $12.50 | Lesser scaup | Neal R. Anderson (1948– ) | |
| 1990 | $12.50 | Black-bellied whistling duck | James "Jim" Hautman | |
| 1991 | $15.00 | King eider | Nancy Howe (1950– ) | First woman Stamp artist |
| 1992 | $15.00 | Spectacled eider | Joseph "Joe" Hautman | |
| 1993 | $15.00 | Canvasback | Bruce Miller (1952– ) | |
| 1994 | $15.00 | Red-breasted merganser | Neal R. Anderson | |
| 1995 | $15.00 | Mallard | James Hautman | |
| 1996 | $15.00 | Surf scoter | Wilhelm Goebel (1960– ) | |
| 1997 | $15.00 | Canada goose | Robert "Bob" Hautman | |
| 1998 | $15.00 | Barrow's goldeneye | Robert Steiner (1949– ) | First pressure-sensitive adhesive (PSA) issue |
| 1999 | $15.00 | Greater scaup | James Hautman | |
| 2000 | $15.00 | Mottled duck | Adam Grimm (1978– ) | |
| 2001 | $15.00 | Northern pintail | Robert Hautman | |
| 2002 | $15.00 | Black scoter | Joseph Hautman | |
| 2003 | $15.00 | Snow goose | Ron Louque | |
| 2004 | $15.00 | Redhead | Scot Storm | |
| 2005 | $15.00 | Hooded merganser | Mark Anderson | |
| 2006 | $15.00 | Ross's goose | Sherrie Russell Meline | |
| 2007 | $15.00 | Ring-necked duck | Richard Clifton | First printing using only offset |
| 2008 | $15.00 | Northern pintail | Joseph Hautman | |
| 2009 | $15.00 | Long-tailed duck | Joshua Spies | |
| 2010 | $15.00 | American wigeon | Robert Bealle | |
| 2011 | $15.00 | Greater white-fronted goose | James Hautman | |
| 2012 | $15.00 | Wood duck | Joseph Hautman | |
| 2013 | $15.00 | Common goldeneye | Robert Steiner | |
| 2014 | $15.00 | Canvasback | Adam Grimm | |
| 2015 | $25.00 | Ruddy duck | Jennifer Miller | |
| 2016 | $25.00 | Trumpeter swan | Joseph Hautman | |
| 2017 | $25.00 | Canada goose | James Hautman | |
| 2018 | $25.00 | Mallard | Robert Hautman | |
| 2019 | $25.00 | Wood duck | Scot Storm | |
| 2020 | $25.00 | Black-bellied whistling duck | Eddie LeRoy | |
| 2021 | $25.00 | Lesser scaup | Richard Clifton | |
| 2022 | $25.00 | Redhead | James Hautman | First Stamp since 2006 to use intaglio engraving, as a security element |
| 2023 | $25.00 | Tundra swan | Joseph Hautman | |
| 2024 | $25.00 | Northern pintail | Chuck Black | |
| 2025 | $25.00 | Spectacled eider | Adam Grimm | |
| 2026 | $25.00 | Bufflehead | James Hautman | |

== In popular culture ==
In the 1996 Coen brothers film Fargo, the protagonist Marge Gunderson's husband Norm Gunderson (played by John Carroll Lynch) is a painter whose submission wins the duck stamp contest.

In September 2021 comedian John Oliver said on Last Week Tonight that he had commissioned and submitted five humorous entries into the contest. These were later auctioned off, fetching nearly $100,000 which was donated to the Federal Duck Stamp program. The U.S. Fish and Wildlife Service released a statement in response, saying "The U.S. Fish and Wildlife Service is excited Last Week Tonight with John Oliver is supportive of wildlife and wetland conservation."

A 2016 documentary, The Million Dollar Duck, tells the story about the contest and some of the contestants.
