= Sea Around Us =

Sea Around Us may refer to:

- The Sea Around Us (film), a 1953 American documentary film directed by Irwin Allen
- The Sea Around Us, a book by Rachel Carson
- The Sea Around Us (song), Irish folk song written by Dominic Behan
- Sea Around Us (organization), an international research initiative
