= Kalmbach =

Kalmbach is a surname of German origin derived from the name of a habitation, Kalmbach on the river Enz.

Kalmbach may refer to:

- Kalmbach Media, an American publisher of books and magazines

Kalmbach may also refer to:

== Notable people ==
- Albert Carpenter Kalmbach (1910–1981), American publisher and founder of Kalmbach Media
- Edwin Richard Kalmbach (1884–1972), American ecologist
- Gudrun Kalmbach (1937–2025), German mathematician
- Herbert Warren Kalmbach (1921–2017), American attorney and banker, involved in the Watergate scandal
