= Les Kouba =

American painter

- Born: Leslie Carl Kouba; February 3, 1917; Hutchinson, Minnesota, U.S.
- Died: September 13, 1998 (aged 81); Minneapolis, Minnesota, U.S.
- Resting place: Lakewood Cemetery
- Education: Hutchinson High School
- Spouse: Orial Thiem (m. 1939; died 1996)
- Parent(s): Anthony and Sophia Kouba

Leslie Carl Kouba (February 3, 1917 – September 13, 1998) was an American artist, author, outdoorsman, and businessman. He specialized in waterfowl paintings but is also known for his early sculpture of Dakota chief Little Crow, which was commissioned by the city of Hutchinson, Minnesota and installed in 1937 at a site overlooking the Crow River. In 1947, he invented the Art-O-Graph, a projector used to transfer a photo to layout. In 1982 he helped produce a new statue for this site, as the first had become weather beaten.

Kouba is credited as being among the artists in the 1970s who popularized wildlife art.

== Early life ==
Born to Anthony and Sophia Kouba, who were first-generation Czech-Americans, Kouba was born during a snowstorm, at their farm two miles east of Hutchinson, Minnesota. Anthony and Sophia owned a small dairy operation. As children, young Kouba and his two brothers, Harry and Ernie, learned to hunt, trap, and fish. Kouba recalled that time spent with his father during this period "contributed to my [his] early appreciation of nature."

== Career ==
Kouba started drawing and painting as a boy. His professional career can be said to have started at age 11, when he sold his first painting to a wealthy German farmer for $8 (approximately $110 in 2014 US dollars). Three years later, Kouba received his only formal art training through a Minneapolis-based correspondence course called the Federal School of Applied Cartooning (currently known as Art Instruction Schools).

Upon graduation, Kouba traveled the United States, painting Coca-Cola logos on commercial signs, before the popularization of decals. Kouba not only painted but improved the logo, sloping and shading the flattened letter. When the Coca-Cola company learned of Kouba's redesign, it gave him a sizable commission for his efforts.

As a young man, Kouba was commissioned by the city of Hutchinson, Minnesota to create a sculpture of Chief Little Crow, a Dakota leader. The statue was placed in 1937 near the Main Street bridge overlooking the Crow River. In 1982 Kouba participated in making a new version, as the old one had become weather beaten. In 1990 he collaborated with Scott D. Anderson to illustrate Anderson's canoe adventure book Distant Fires: From Duluth to Hudson Bay, which went on to win the 1991 ALA Best Book for Young Adults Award.

Kouba opened his own commercial art firm called Kouba Advertising Art. He produced the following in his Minneapolis-based studio: The Old Dutch windmill on potato chips bags and boxes, Schmidt beer wildlife scenes, and the Red Owl grocery store's logo.

Kouba patented three inventions: the original Art-O-Graph and Map-O-Graph, which project enlarged images of artwork and maps. He also received US Patent: 2478585, for goose decoys made of folded paper.

== Personal life ==
In 1939, he married Orial Anna Rose Thiem, of Gibbon, Minnesota. She was five years Kouba's senior. The couple was married for more than 55 years, until her death in 1996.

Kouba died on September 13, 1998. He was buried in Lakewood Cemetery.

== Honors and accomplishments ==
- Commissioned for sculpture of Chief Little Crow, by city of Hutchinson, Minnesota.
- Federal Duck Stamp Contest Winner (1958,1967) (Note: In 71 years of available sales figures, Kouba's stamps 1958 and 1967 are ranked 15th and 25th best selling Federal Duck Stamps, making an estimated $77.2 million (in 2014 dollars).)
- Ducks Unlimited Artist of the Year (1976,1977)
- Minnesota Waterfowl Stamp Competition (1978)
