= Kira Sabin =

American nature and wildlife painter

- Born: Kira Fennell; March 22, 1999 (age 27)
- Education: Hutchinson High School; Minneapolis College of Art and Design
- Occupation: Painter

Instagram information
- Page: Kira Sabin
- Genre: Art
- Followers: 128 K

TikTok information
- Page: kira sabin
- Years active: 2020–present
- Genre: Art
- Followers: 313 k
- Last updated: October 12, 2025

Kira Sabin (born 22 March 1999) is an American nature and wildlife painter, best known for their involvement in the Federal Duck Stamp contest.

== Early life and education ==
Born Kira Fennell, Sabin grew up alongside their twin, Kess Fennell, in the small town of Hutchinson, Minnesota. Both siblings wanted to become artists from a young age, and were influenced by their mother, who was a graphic designer.

Sabin began writing a novel at age 16, and self-published the work, titled i once met a Girl who paints the lines on roads, through Amazon’s Kindle Direct Publishing in December 2017.

Sabin and their twin attended Hutchinson High School, where they both earned top marks in AP Art. Sabin also won awards for their art in regional high school competitions. After graduating from high school in 2017, Sabin attended the Minneapolis College of Art and Design, graduating in 2021 with a degree in painting and drawing.

== Art career ==
After graduating college, Sabin began pursuing art as a professional career.

In 2023, Sabin painted a mural of a cow in Hutchinson, Minnesota as part of the city's mural project.

=== Federal Duck Stamp contest ===
In 2019, Sabin was introduced to the Federal Duck Stamp contest by their grandfather, who was a waterfowl hunter. They entered the contest for the first time that year, with a painting of a black-bellied whistling duck. Neither their 2019 entry nor their 2020 entry, of red-breasted mergansers, made it past the first round of judging. Sabin was the contest's youngest competitor in 2020.

In July 2021, Sabin began posting about their newest Federal Duck Stamp entry on TIkTok. Their videos went viral, with the initial video ultimately gaining more than 2.6 million views, giving Sabin 200,000 followers. Several publications, including BuzzFeed News and CBS News, credited Sabin with "reenergizing" the competition, and popularizing it among social media users. Their 2021 entry, which featured two Ross's geese, did not initially make it past the first round of judging, but was picked by a judge to be included in the second round of judging.

Sabin's 2022 entry, featuring a Mottled duck hen, made it to the second round of judging in the contest. Their 2023 entry, of northern pintails, did not. Sabin's twin, Kess Fennell, also entered into the Duck Stamp competition in 2023, with a painting of Harlequin ducks.

== Personal life ==
Sabin is non-binary, and has used she/her and they/them pronouns. They married their partner, Greyley Sabin, in 2022.
