= Richard Bishop =

Richard Bishop may refer to:

- Richard M. Bishop (1812–1893), American politician
- Richard Bishop (gridiron football) (1950–2016), American football defensive tackle
- Richard Bishop (guitarist), American guitarist, member of Sun City Girls
- Richard Bishop (gymnast) (1910–1996), American Olympic gymnast
- Richard Bishop (MP), Member of Parliament (MP) for Hastings
- Richard Bishop (painter) (1887–1975), American painter
- Richard L. Bishop (1931–2019), American mathematician
- Richard Evelyn Donohue Bishop (1925–1989), British physicist and FRS
