= Scott D. Anderson =

American aviator (1965–1999)

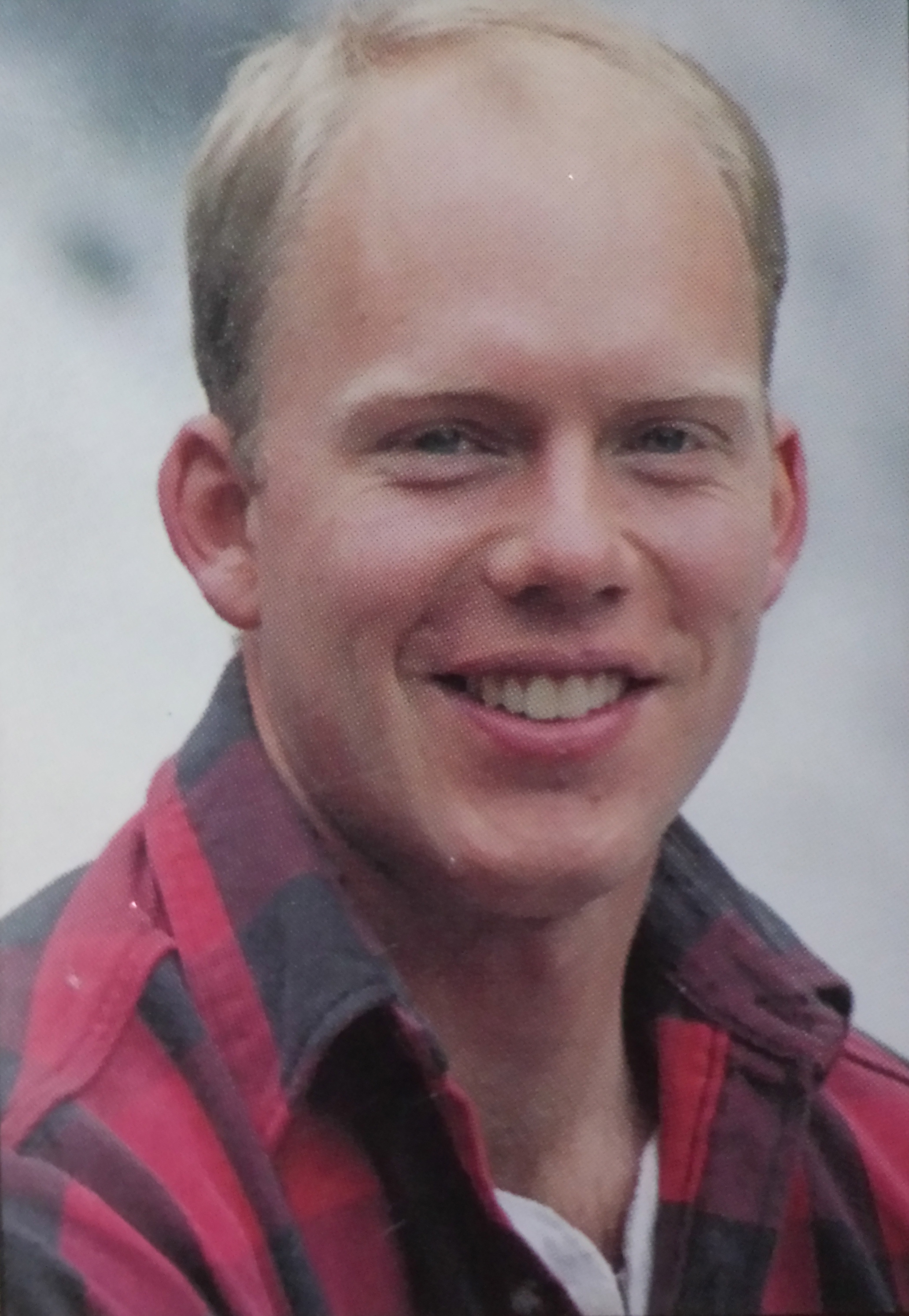
- Anderson circa 1990
- Born: May 2, 1965; Boston, Massachusetts, US
- Died: March 23, 1999 (aged 33); Duluth, Minnesota, US
- Cause of death: Plane crash
- Education: Duluth East High School; University of Minnesota; Stanford University (BSE)
- Occupations: Major and flight instructor in the Minnesota Air National Guard, Cirrus Aircraft test pilot and flight operations officer, inventor, author, engineer
- Years active: 1987–1999
- Known for: Cirrus Airframe Parachute System test pilot; Distant Fires (1990) and Unknown Rider (1995)
- Spouse: Laurie Anderson
- Children: 1
- Awards: American Library Association Best Book For Young Adults—Distant Fires (1991); Minnesota Aviation Hall of Fame Inductee (2010)
- Website: salfleaders.com

Major Scott Douglas Anderson (May 2, 1965 – March 23, 1999) was an American aviator, engineer, outdoor adventurer, and award-winning author. He flew F-16s and instructed pilots for the Air National Guard, and was a general aviation test pilot and flight operations officer. In 1998, he completed the flight-testing of the first certified whole-plane parachute recovery system, the Cirrus Airframe Parachute System (CAPS), which is credited with saving over 200 lives as standard equipment on Duluth, Minnesota-based Cirrus Aircraft's line of single-engine light aircraft.

In 1999, Anderson died in a plane crash near the Duluth International Airport while conducting tests of the first production model Cirrus SR20. He was posthumously inducted into the Minnesota Aviation Hall of Fame in 2010 for his contributions to the development and advancement of aviation in the state. The Scott D. Anderson Leadership Foundation was created in his honor.

== Early years and education ==
Scott Anderson was born in Boston, Massachusetts. He and his family moved to Duluth, Minnesota when he was six years old. He graduated from Duluth East High School as a star football player and went on to attend the University of Minnesota. As an undergraduate engineering student-intern and a member of Minnesota Power's Research and Development team, Anderson earned recognition as co-inventor on a U.S. patent. He continued his college career later at Stanford University, where he led an undergraduate team to build a two-person submarine. Anderson graduated from Stanford in 1987 with degrees in mechanical engineering and history.

== Career ==
In 1987, the summer after graduating college, Anderson and his friend Steve Baker planned a marathon canoe trip from Duluth to York Factory on the Hudson Bay. After completing the 1,700-mile-long exploit, he wrote his first book, Distant Fires, published in 1990, an autobiographical adventure story based on their experiences during the journey. Distant Fires was widely received by the local community at the time of its release—the Duluth News Tribune describing it as a marvelous "voyage of discovery"—and went on to win Anderson the American Library Association Best Book for Young Adults Award in 1991.

Anderson was also a saxophonist, performing in Duluth jazz bands during the late 1980s and early 1990s. He then moved from the United States to Salzburg, Austria to play professional American football, before returning to become a pilot flying F-16s for the Air National Guard and flight instructing with Duluth's 179th Fighter Squadron. His second publication, and first novel, Unknown Rider (1995), was a fictional manifestation of his experience achieving the title "Fighter Pilot". He summed up his writing process saying, "When I was training to fly the F-16 at Kingsley Field in Oregon, each evening, after a day of flying fighters, I sat down and typed a little bit of this book… All I had to do was invent a few characters, put them in an airplane, and make them the heroes of the stories that filled the air."

=== Cirrus Aircraft ===
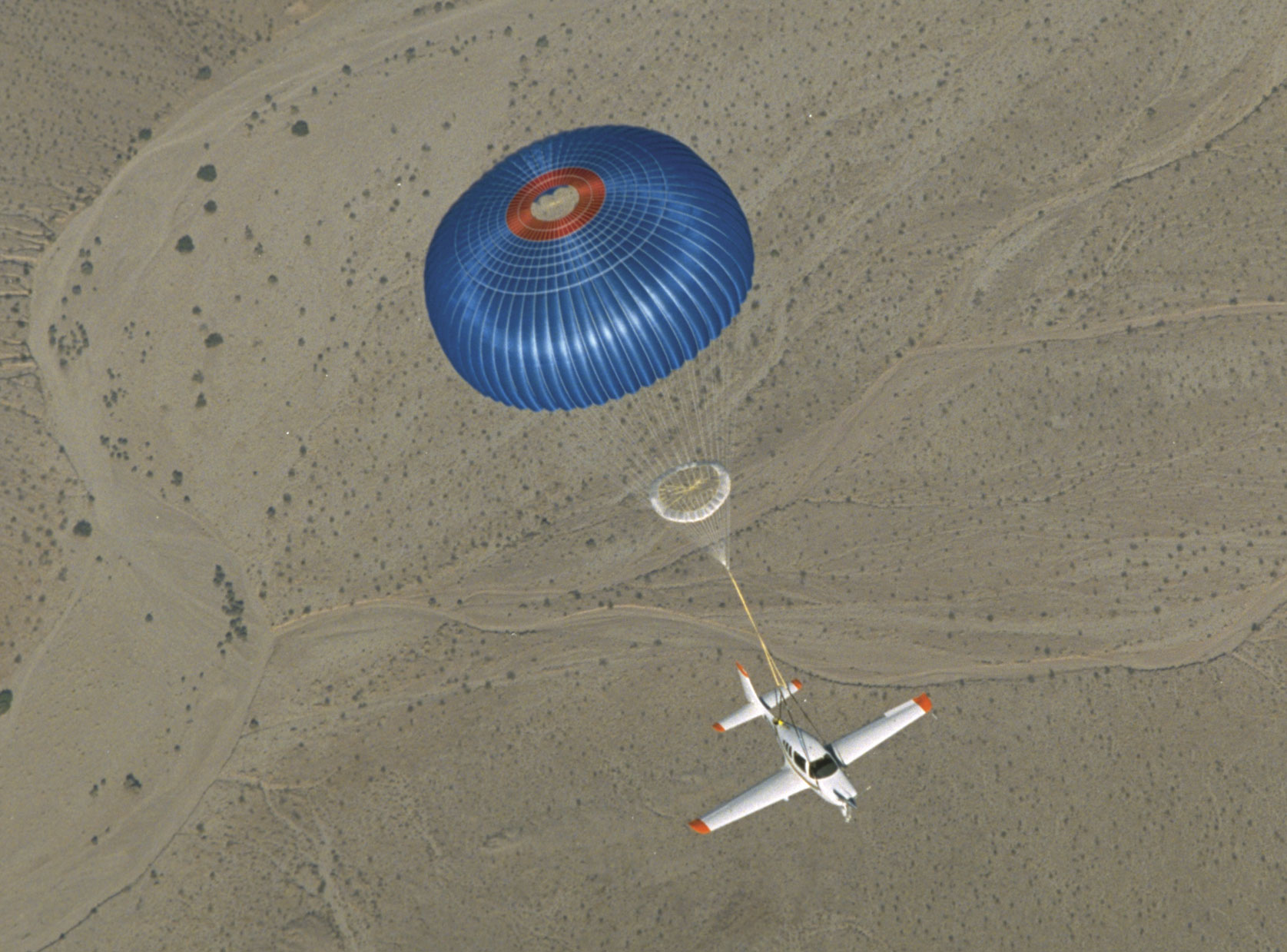
Cirrus SR20 test deployment of the Cirrus Airframe Parachute System (CAPS) over the southern California desert in 1998, Scott Anderson piloting

At the beginning of 1996, Anderson's career path led him to Cirrus Design (now called Cirrus Aircraft), a newly Duluth-landed general aviation startup founded by two brothers, Alan and Dale Klapmeier, hailing from a rural southern Wisconsin farm. He was named director of flight operations along with chief test pilot for the company, contributing his efforts to the early developmental stages of the Cirrus SR20 single-engine four-seat composite aircraft. In addition to all-composite construction, the SR20 introduced the light aircraft manufacturing industry to a number of innovative new designs, including a single power-lever that adjusts both throttle and propeller RPM, a side-yoke flight control system, a spin-resistant wing design, and a large LCD cockpit display for the avionics. In 1997, Anderson became the lead test pilot on a groundbreaking safety innovation by Ballistic Recovery Systems and Cirrus Aircraft. The feature was titled the Cirrus Airframe Parachute System (CAPS), and acted as a parachute recovery device installed on the SR20 that was designed to lower the entire aircraft safely to the ground after a loss of control or structural failure.

External videos
- Anderson flight-testing CAPS on the SR20 during a spin

Anderson worked closest on the project with fellow Cirrus test pilot Gary Black, who also formerly flew jets for the military, as well as the company's chief engineer, Paul Johnston, who played a crucial role in the design process of the CAP system. Flight testing for CAPS began by the summer of 1998; the Cirrus team went out to the high desert of southern California where Anderson would conduct the first test. He deployed the parachute multiple times during dives and spins, to simulate recovery after a midair collision or after spatial disorientation, and from level flight to resemble engine failure. At this time Cirrus only had two SR20 prototypes, so in order to test the parachute repeatedly Anderson would restart the engine mid-air while descending under the parachute, cut the chute loose and land the plane normally for it to be tested again (ground-impact testing took place with a mockup that would be dropped at the calculated descent-velocity and measured based on sustained damage to the fuselage). Anderson successfully made all eight of the company's in-flight test deployments of CAPS. The SR20 became FAA approved and typed certified in October 1998, making Anderson the first pilot in history to successfully test a certified aircraft equipped with a ballistic parachute.

== Death ==
The following year, on 23 March 1999, Anderson died while putting the first production SR20 through experimental test flights before it went on sale. The purpose of the flight was to perform routine torture-test maneuvers and assess changes to the aileron if there were any issues. The incident occurred after the plane's aileron had jammed. Anderson was about 4 nautical miles (7.4 km; 4.6 mi) from Duluth International Airport at the start of the flight when he radioed the control tower that he was returning due to a problem. At about 1.5 nautical miles (2.8 km; 1.7 mi) from the airport, he declared an emergency. Less than 400 metres (1,300 ft) out, Anderson crashed into a vacant exercise yard on the federal prison grounds located off the airport’s south side. He died later that day in the hospital at age 33. The plane Anderson was flying had not yet been equipped with the standard CAPS that would come on every aircraft. Due to Cirrus being in very early production phase, the company was 10 days away from receiving production model chute systems at the time of Anderson's death. Cirrus has never test-flown an aircraft without a parachute since.

=== Posthumous recognition ===
A memorial of Anderson located in downtown Duluth's Leif Erickson Park, detailing a passage from his 1990 book Distant Fires

18-term U.S. Congressman from Minnesota Jim Oberstar paid tribute to Anderson shortly after his death on the floor of the House Chamber, calling him a "hero" and a "pioneer in general aviation". Oberstar went on to say, "Scott made a profound difference to the State of Minnesota and to the national aviation community". Cirrus Aircraft co-founder and former CEO Dale Klapmeier spoke at Anderson's induction into the Minnesota Aviation Hall of Fame on 24 April 2010, stating, "Scott was an exemplary pilot and person. During his tenure at Cirrus, he made considerable contributions to the company, the industry, and aviation safety that many people still benefit from today… To date, 17 CAPS deployments have saved 35 lives due to Scott's pioneering work." Klapmeier also acknowledged Anderson while accepting the Collier Trophy on behalf of the Cirrus Vision Jet team in 2018, as the pilot who "grabbed that handle and pulled the chute for the first time.”

Anderson has been referenced multiple times in national articles and columns such as The Atlantic and The New York Times Magazine by journalist, author and former speechwriter for President Jimmy Carter, James Fallows, who in a 2007 article called him a "Renaissance man" and "beloved, charismatic figure in Duluth". Anderson was also a supporting theme in Fallows' 2001 book, Free Flight: Inventing the Future of Travel.

=== Legacy ===
In the months following his death, Cirrus continued on to redesign the aileron in order to prevent the problem that killed Anderson, and sold their first SR20 in July 1999. The SR20's successor, the Cirrus SR22, became the world's best-selling general aviation airplane in 2003 and has held the title every year since, with a combined overall production of more than 6,000 examples from 1999–2015, something that hadn't been accomplished in the aviation industry for the last half-century. As of September 2021, there have been 126 CAPS deployments saving 220 lives.

The Scott D. Anderson Leadership Foundation (SALF) was established in late 1999 and is a fund of the Duluth Superior Area Community Foundation. It allows a group of high school students each year to receive scholarships dedicated to the delivery of high-quality, value-based leadership training.

Anderson is memorialized by the "ANDOE" waypoint for the outer marker on ILS runway 27 approaching Duluth International Airport.

== Personal life ==
Anderson was a practicing Christian throughout the entirety of his life. On the SALF organization's website, it lists several of its "Guided Values and Principles", focusing on promotion towards the common good, community, affirming the dignity of individuals, encouraging creativity, mentorship, pursuing goals, and strengthening one's character, stating:

These principles and values emanate from the Biblical foundations of the Judeo-Christian faith, which were formative in the life of Scott Anderson.

He is survived by his wife Laurie, their son Evan (born 1999), his siblings Catherine and Todd, and parents Paul and Carol. Scott's father Paul Anderson serves as the president of SALF.

The Anderson family resides in Duluth, Minnesota.

== Bibliography ==
- Distant Fires: From Duluth to Hudson Bay (autobiographical outdoor recreation book with Les Kouba as illustrator, 1990)
- Unknown Rider (fictional fighter pilot novel with Andrea Dwyer as illustrator, 1995)
- The Mosquito Book (entomological self-help book with Tony Dierkens as co-author, 1998)

== See also ==
- Canoeing with the Cree - 1935 book that served as the inspiration for Distant Fires
