= Lydia Young Hayes =

American educator (1871–1943)

- Lydia Young Hayes, from a 1931 newspaper
- Born: September 11, 1871; Hutchinson, Minnesota
- Died: February 8, 1943 (aged 71); Bemidji, Minnesota
- Occupations: Educator, advocate for blind people
- Known for: Director, New Jersey Commission for the Blind

Lydia Young Hayes (September 11, 1871 – February 8, 1943) was an American educator, and the first director of the New Jersey Commission for the Blind.

== Early life ==
Lydia Young Hayes was born in Hutchinson, Minnesota, the daughter of Charles W. Hayes, a farmer. She became blind as a girl, after a farm accident. She graduated from the Perkins School for the Blind in Boston, and trained as a teacher at the Kindergarten Normal School of Boston University.

== Career ==
Hayes taught blind children and adults as a young woman. In 1904, she was chosen by the Massachusetts Commission for the Blind as one of the state's two home educators for blind adults. Helen Keller recommended Hayes to the governor of New Jersey, to lead that state's programs for blind residents. Hayes became the first director of the New Jersey Commission for the Blind in 1910.

During her tenure, New Jersey did not open a state school for blind children; instead, it offered braille classes in public schools, and integrated classes including both blind and sighted students. "It is more and more believed that the segregation of the blind is not wise either for youth or adult," she told a newspaper in 1913. The state's home education program helped blind adults learn braille and vocational skills.

Hayes testified at a 1937 Congressional hearing on "talking-book records" and equipment in New Jersey libraries: "The majority of the older blind do not read by touch and the talking book is the only way to hear the stories in which they are interested," she explained, adding "in many cases this provides their only recreation". She retired from the director's role in 1937, but remained active with the commission as an educational consultant until 1942.

Hayes was also executive secretary of the New Jersey State Association for the Blind, and president of the Perkins Institution alumnae association. She was a delegate and served on the hospitality committee at the World Conference on Work for the Blind, when it met in New York in 1931. In 1936, she attended the funeral of Anne Sullivan Macy.

== Personal life and legacy ==
In retirement, Hayes moved to Bemidji, Minnesota. She lived with her nephew William Grant Hayes and his wife, Helen Schultz Hayes, who was deafblind and a former student of Lydia Y. Hayes.

Hayes died in Bemidji in 1943, aged 71 years. "She insisted that segregation of the blind was not the part of a proper teaching process", noted a colleague at the time of her death. The Lydia Hayes Memorial Association formed in 1949, and ran the Lydia Hayes Home for the Aged Blind in Kenvil, New Jersey. There was a Lydia Hayes Memorial Award given by the New Jersey State Commission for the Blind for "outstanding achievement by a blind person".
