= Duluth Superior Area Community Foundation =

The Duluth Superior Area Community Foundation (DSACF) is a grant-making organization located in Duluth, Minnesota, United States. DSACF promotes private giving for the public good. DSACF serves seven counties in NE Minnesota (Aitkin, Carlton, Cook, Itasca, Koochiching, Lake and St. Louis) and NW Wisconsin (Ashland, Douglas and Bayfield). DSACF holds $50 million in assets, has 300 charitable funds and has awarded $37 million in grants and scholarships.

== Grants and scholarships ==
DSACF has worked with individuals, families, private foundations, and companies to provide thousands of grants totaling millions of dollars for nonprofits and area students to enhance the quality of life in this region.

DSACF supports activities in five basic areas including:

- Arts
- Community and Economic Development
- Education
- Environment
- Human Services

== Initiatives ==
DSACF serves the community as grant makers and community leaders. DSACF works with community stakeholders to find solutions to issues that help maintain a vibrant community.

DSACF Initiatives include:

- Knight Creative Communities Initiative
- Attracting & Retaining Young Adults
- Young Leaders Fund
- TwinPortsConnex
- 20 Under 40
- Scott Anderson Leadership
- Social Capital Benchmark
- Speak Your Peace: The Civility Project
