= Hutchinson Technology =

American technology company

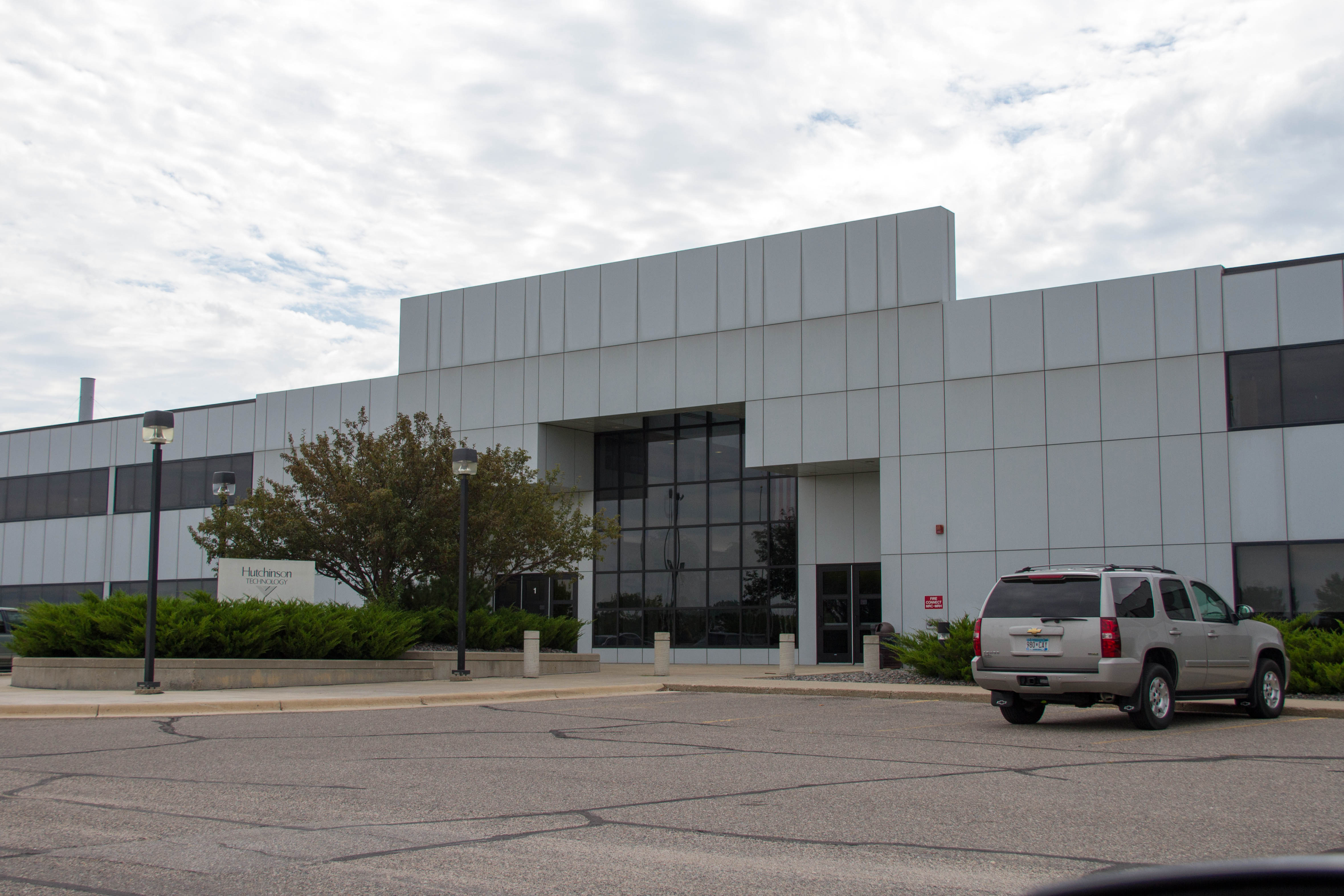
Hutchinson Technology Headquarters in Hutchinson, Minnesota

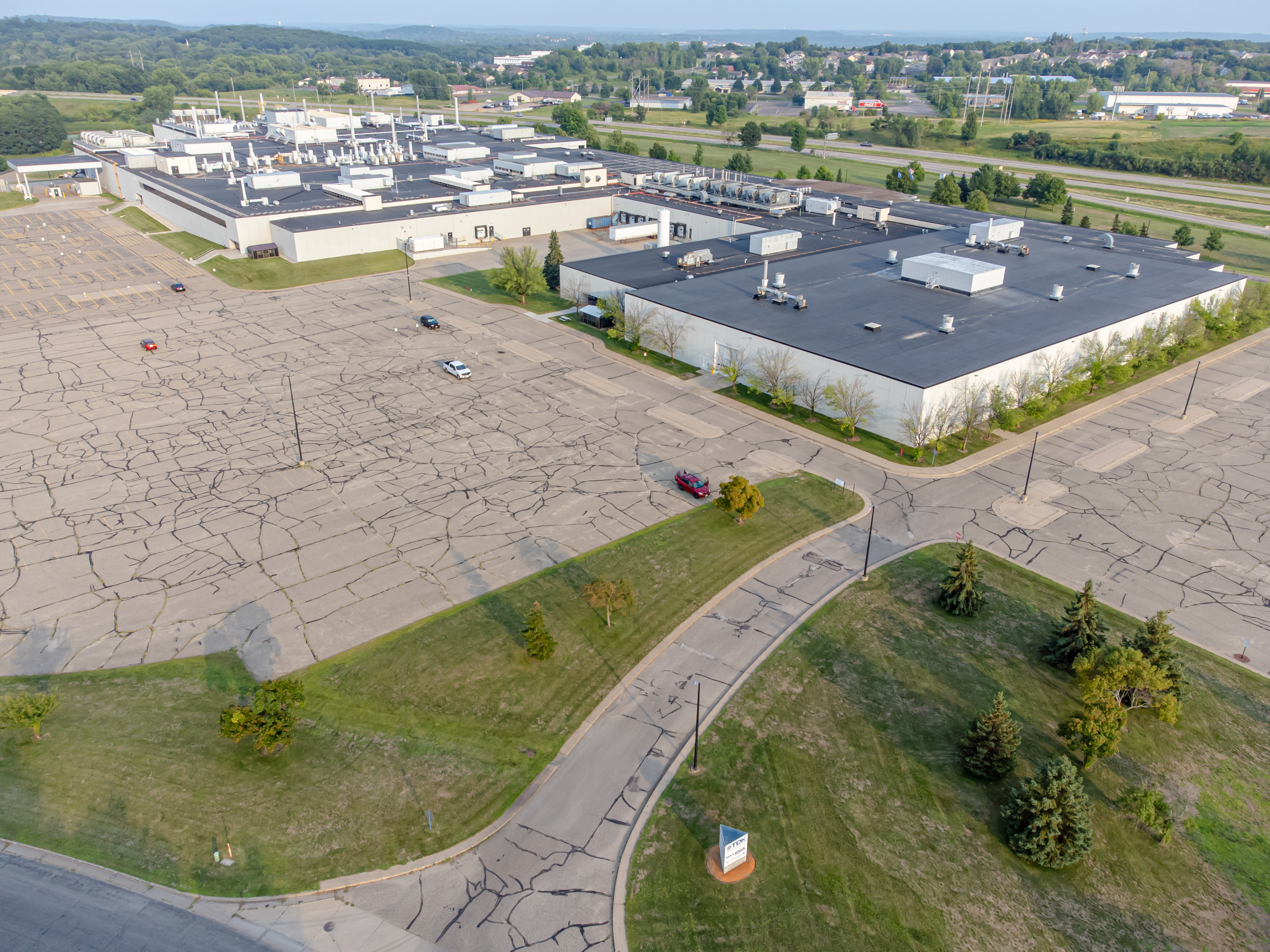
TDK in Eau Claire

Hutchinson Technology is an engineering company established and headquartered in Minnesota, United States, specializing in the design and manufacture of precision technologies. Hutchinson's primary products are suspension assemblies that hold magnetic read-write heads at microscopic distances above the disks in rigid disk drives.

== History ==
Hutchinson Technology was founded in 1965 by Jon Geiss and Jeffrey Green, initially to produce gyroscope components for missiles. It subsequently supplied printed circuit boards to Minnesota's two largest computer companies, Univac and Control Data. With contracts from Control Data and IBM in the 1970s, it developed specialized mechanisms that precisely position the read-write heads for magnetic disk drives. The company grew to employ 3,000 people (2001-2010).

On November 2, 2015 Japanese electronics company TDK announced plans to purchase Hutchinson Technology for $126 million.
