= Under the Sea Wind =

1941 book by Rachel Carson

- First edition
- Author: Rachel L. Carson
- Illustrator: Howard Frech (first); Robert W. Hines (1991)
- Language: English
- Series: Sea trilogy
- Subject: Ocean and shore life
- Genre: Nature writing
- Publisher: Simon & Schuster (1941); Oxford University Press (1952); Penguin Nature Classics (1996)
- Publication date: 1941
- Publication place: United States
- Media type: Print
- Followed by: The Sea Around Us

Under the Sea Wind: A Naturalist's Picture of Ocean Life (1941) is the first book written by the American marine biologist Rachel Carson. It was published by Simon & Schuster in 1941 and received very good reviews, but sold poorly. After the great success of a sequel The Sea Around Us (Oxford, 1951), it was reissued by Oxford University Press; that edition was an alternate Book-of-the-Month Club selection and became another bestseller, and has never gone out of print. It is recognized as one of the "definitive works of American nature writing," and is in print as one of the Penguin Nature Classics.

Under the sea-wind was reportedly Rachel Carson's personal favourite book, although first edition copies by Simon & Schuster remain scarce.

== Background ==
Under the Sea Wind was based on the article Undersea by Carson, published in The Atlantic Monthly in 1937. This article began as an eleven-page introduction to a government fisheries brochure, and grew into Carson's first book. Prior to publishing Undersea, she wrote marine themed radio scripts which influenced her later work. The article elaborates on ecology and the unwavering will to survive that embodies marine organisms. After the article was published, Dutch-born children's author Hendrik Van Loon became interested in Carson's work. He supported and encouraged her to continue this type of depiction of nature in her writing, as well as advising her about publishing. Carson furthered the perspectives from her article and expanded them in Under the Sea Wind, which was described as her personal favorite. The initial failure of Under the Sea Wind may have been due to the bombing of Pearl Harbor and America entering World War II the same year it was published. The book became popular after the publication of the second book in the Sea Trilogy, The Sea Around Us, and it was this second text that established her as a natural history author.

== Description ==
Under the Sea Wind describes the behavior of organisms that live both on and in the sea on the Atlantic coast. Under the Sea Wind consists of three parts, each following a different organism that interacts with the sea, and viewing it from a personified organism's perspective. The first section, Edge of the Sea, follows a female sanderling Carson names Silverbar. The second section, The Gull's Way, follows a mackerel named Scomber, and the third section, River and Sea follows Anguilla, an eel. The narrative follows these creature's migration habits over the span of a year.

Viewing ocean life from a broader ecological perspective was crucial to Carson, rather than just isolating parts of the sea. The term "sea wind" was Carson's way of referring to the entirety of the shore, sea, and sky. Carson had a poetic way of writing about nature, while still maintaining the scientific accuracy of her observations. Her work draws connections between nature and home, the borders of interrelated communities, and the growing separation between man and nature. Carson took inspiration from natural history authors such as Henry Williamson and Henry Beston, and uses her scientific expertise to ground Under the Sea Wind in scientifically accurate detail on each animal's appearance, diet and behavior.

Carson's stated goal of using poetic prose and personifying sea life was "to make the sea and its life as vivid a reality for those who may read the book as it has become for me during the past decade." This writing style brought scientific observations to a larger audience, and as stated by fellow marine environmentalist author Joel Hedgpeth in a review of the book, allowed for "turning the subject of the sea to a respectable reading matter for the clientele of the New Yorker and Reader's Digest sets, and inspiring a fashion in literature about the sea, its ways, and creatures." The style of Carson's writing makes the book suitable for children as well as adults, and the appeal is enhanced with illustrations, originally by Howard Frech. These were eventually replaced in 1991 with illustrations by Robert W. Hines. Though Under the Sea Wind is a story of struggle and chance survival, the style that Carson presents is in stark contrast to her later work, Silent Spring, which is much more dire and analytical.
