= Edwin Richard Kalmbach =

American ecologist (1884-1972)

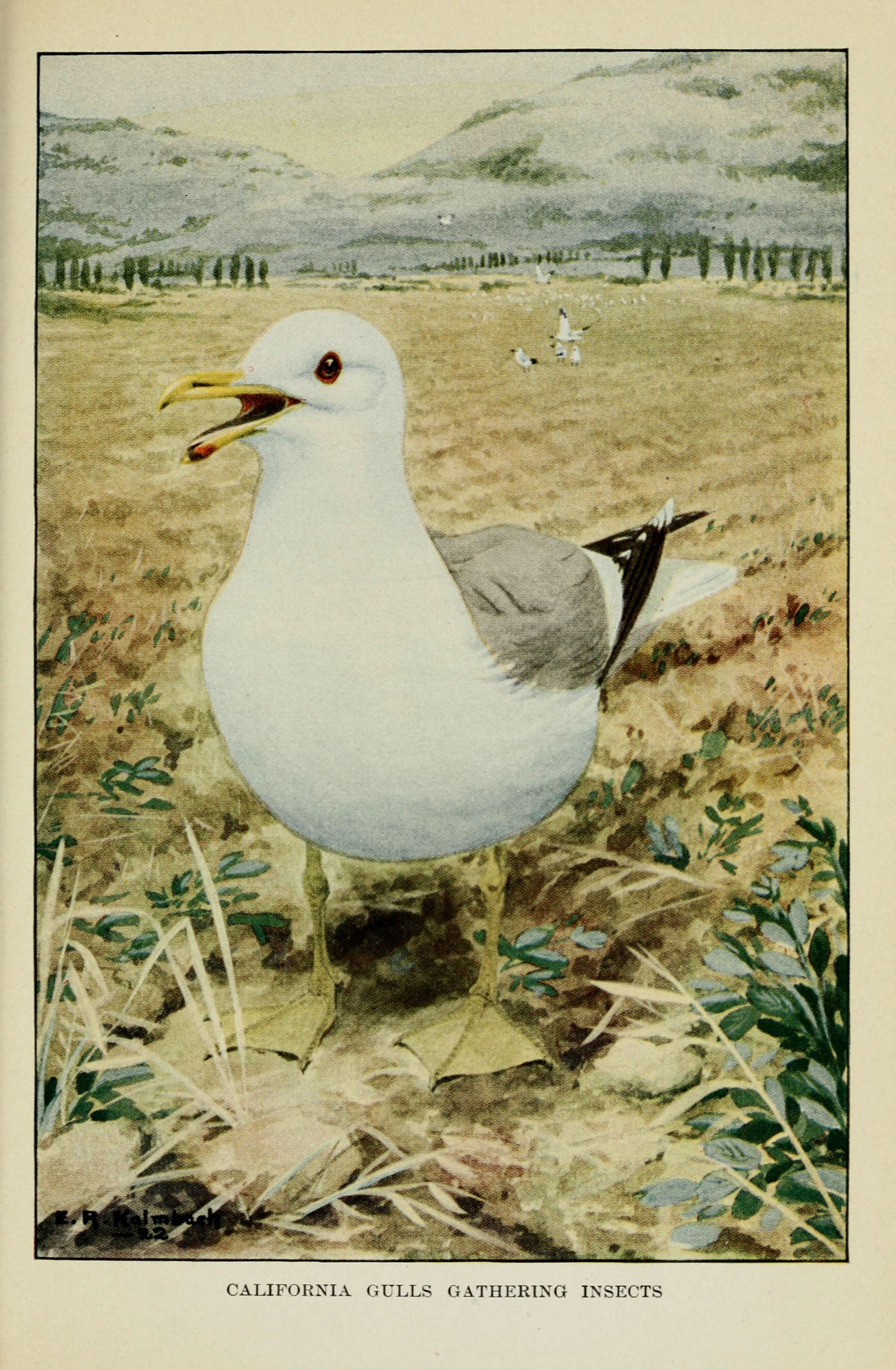
California gull gathering insects, painting by Kalmbach

Edwin Richard Kalmbach (29 April 1884 – 26 August 1972) was an American ecologist who worked on applied entomology and ornithology and was involved in examining the value of birds to agriculture. He was also an artist and illustrator.

Kalmbach was born in Grand Rapids, Michigan where he went to high school and shortly after graduating, he joined the Kent Scientific Museum in 1903. In 1907 he undertook a canoe expedition from Jackson to Grand Rapids collecting bird specimens and documenting habitats. In 1910 he joined the Division of Economic Investigations of the Bureau of Biological survey and worked until his retirement in 1954. He became the director of the Food Habits Laboratory, Denver, Colorado in 1931 and worked mainly on ornithology and wildlife conservation but also contributed to entomology. Along with his wife, he also collected botanical specimens, with nearly 3000 specimens from Colorado which became the nucleus for the Denver Botanical Gardens.

Kalmbach was involved in the establishment of the Federal Duck Stamp Act of 1934 to raise funds for waterfowl management. He proposed the first set of designs with art by Bob Hines and designed the ruddy duck stamp of 1941–42. He received an Aldo Leopold Memorial Award in 1958.
