= John A. Ruthven =

American artist (1924–2020)

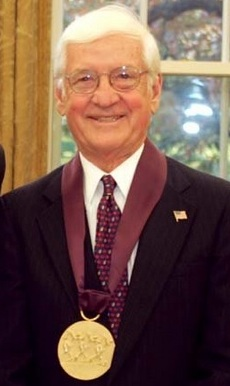
Ruthven receiving the 2004 National Medal of Arts

John Aldrich Ruthven (November 12, 1924 – October 11, 2020) was an American artist best known for his paintings of wildlife.

== Biography ==
Ruthven was born in Cincinnati, Ohio in November 1924. After serving in the U.S. military in World War II, Ruthven attended the Art Academy of Cincinnati and received his certificate in 1947. He opened a commercial art studio in Cincinnati. His work for clients included the Play-Doh Boy, used in that product's original 1950s advertising. Ruthven's focus, however, was on wildlife painting in the style of John James Audubon. In 1960, his painting "Redhead Ducks" won the Federal Duck Stamp competition.

Ruthven's wildlife paintings are on display at many museums including the Smithsonian Institution, and his work was featured in a 1994 retrospective at the Cincinnati Museum of Natural History. He designed two pigs for Cincinnati's Big Pig Gig in 2000. Other artwork includes a Passenger pigeon mural on the wall of a six-story building in Cincinnati which can be seen in the 2014 documentary From Billions To None by David Mrazek and Joel Greenberg. The mural is located at 15 8th Street. Sometime after 2004, Ruthven donated antique printing press equipment to the Heritage Village Museum in Sharonville, Ohio.

Ruthven was awarded the National Medal of Arts in 2004. He later lived on a farm near Georgetown, Ohio and died in October 2020 at the age of 95.
