= Maynard Reece =

American artist (1920–2020)

Maynard Fred Reece (April 26, 1920 – July 11, 2020) was an American artist based in Iowa whose work focused on wildlife, particularly ducks. He won the Federal Duck Stamp competition a record five times in his life: 1948, 1951, 1959, 1969 and 1971. Reece turned 100 in April 2020 and died in July that year.

== Early life and education ==
Reece was born in Arnolds Park on Lake Okoboji in northwestern Iowa. His father was a Quaker minister. The nature of his father's work meant that the family moved often, and this gave Reece exposure to many different aspects of American rural beauty. "Growing up on the marshes of northwest Iowa, Maynard Reece began drawing and painting with pencils and barn paints. His seventh grade teacher introduced him to watercolors, and he decided to become an artist.

In 1940, Reece moved to the capital city of Des Moines for work where he found a job in the museum of the Iowa Department of History and Archives. During his time there, he met Ding Darling, Iowa's most prolific and acclaimed political cartoonist of the time, who became a mentor to Reece's burgeoning talent in drawing.

== Art ==
In 1948, Reece won his first Federal Duck Stamp competition. These are not postage stamps but rather stamps required for all waterfowl hunters to have in their possession when hunting waterfowl. He became a prolific and often-published artist. His illustrations have appeared in magazines such as Life, Sports Illustrated, Saturday Evening Post, Sports Afield, Outdoor Life, Ducks Unlimited and National Wildlife. Moreover, he has published two books devoted to his own wildlife art: The Waterfowl Art of Maynard Reece and The Upland Bird Art of Maynard Reece.

His art combines an accuracy of detail with a keen expressiveness of feeling. "Much has been written about the accuracy of Reece's artwork; every detail correct - feathers, position, wind, weather and weeds...These things are combined with a feel for color, a sensitivity to the moods of nature and the ability to dip back into the mental images of decades of outdoor observation to create a work of art which is much more than the sum of its parts."

== Awards ==
- 1948. Federal Duck Stamp
- 1951. Federal Duck Stamp
- 1959. Federal Duck Stamp
- 1969. Federal Duck Stamp
- 1971. Federal Duck Stamp
- 1972. Duck stamp design for the state of Iowa
- 1977. Duck stamp design for the state of Iowa
- 1981. Iowa Habitat Stamp
- 1981. Iowa Trout Stamp
- 1982. Arkansas Duck Stamp
- 1983. Texas Duck Stamp,
- 1983. Missouri's First of State Turkey Stamp
- 1983. Ruffed Grouse Society's annual fundraiser
- 1988. Arkansas Duck Stamp

== Publications ==
- The Waterfowl Art of Maynard Reece
- The Upland Bird Art of Maynard Reece.
