= Walter A. Weber =

American mammalogist and animal artist (1906–1979)

- Born: May 23, 1906; Chicago, Illinois
- Died: January 10, 1979 (aged 72); Lynchburg, Virginia
- Occupations: Mammalogist, illustrator and artist

Walter Alois Weber (May 23, 1906 - January 10, 1979) was an American mammalogist, animal artist, and illustrator for National Geographic. He was noted for his colorful and realistic-looking sketches and paintings of animals, particularly wild cats, Alaska Peninsula brown bears, American black bears, coyotes, and dog breeds, including retrievers, hounds, and sporting dogs. He also painted portraits of many other birds, mammals, and reptiles. His work in National Geographic held the public's attention from 1939 to 1968. In 1967, he was given the Conservation Service Award.

== Early life ==
Weber was born May 23, 1906, in Chicago, to poor immigrants, who had trouble caring for their family of eleven children. He had a natural talent for art, and at age nine he began taking art classes at the Chicago Art Center. Weber sold his art prints to make enough money to buy his art supplies. Weber went to the University of Chicago, graduating in 1927. He earned a Bachelor of Science in zoology and botany, and he worked with Carl Rungius, a big game painter.

== Life as an artist ==
From 1928 to 1931, Walter worked for the Field Museum of Natural History in Chicago as a collector and artist. He contributed to many books and magazines, and was hired in 1936 by the National Park Service as a field artist after a year of wildlife researching in Oklahoma and Texas. In 1941, he became an ornithologist at the National Museum of Natural History in Washington DC.

In 1944, he returned to artistry. During this time he worked under contract for the National Geographic Society and for private collectors, and did ink drawings for the book Meeting the Mammals. Between 1944 and 1957, he painted covers for seven books sponsored by the Wildlife Management Institute. From 1949 to 1971, he was the chief nature artist in the National Geographic Society.

His artistry came in many forms. He designed a symbol for the cover of Journal of Wildlife Management using hieroglyphics, and an eagle design painted by him was copied for use by the Apollo astronauts. Starting in 1971, he designed an eagle and osprey for the US dollar, which was widely used. Over 250 of his paintings (some signed with his pseudonym "Al Kreml") were featured on stamps issued by the National Wildlife Federation from 1940 to 1961. From 1941 to 1954, he created cover illustrations for the Pittman-Robertson Quarterly. He was the first person to design two federal duck stamps, having been asked to do so in 1944 and winning the first open national design competition in 1950. The first stamp depicted a white-fronted geese, while the second portrayed trumpeter swans.

Walter's most famous work was his paintings featured in National Geographic from 1939 to 1968. He painted a wide range of nature subjects including deer, birds, cats, dogs (almost all paintings featured in The National Geographic Book of Dogs were painted by him), fishes, and bears.

In addition to National Geographic, Walter's paintings also appeared in:

- Song and Garden Birds of North America
- Water Prey and Game Birds of North America
- Wondrous World of Fishes
- Wild Animals of North America
- Birds of Colorado
- Birds of the Republic of Panama
- Breeding Birds of North Dakota
- Homes and Habits of Wild Animals by Karl Patterson Schmidt

Many of his prints are still available online.

Walter was helpful and caring toward younger artists looking for help. He was known to give away his art to those he liked, but quote extremely high prices for those he did not. He was very upset when his art was plagiarized, but was not opposed to its use when requested, including the Territory of Papua and New Guinea's use of some of his bird paintings for their postage stamps.

By 1971, at age 65, Weber had mostly retired from art and instead had taken a role in the Washington Biologists' Field Club. He remained there until his death in 1979. Weber died of a stroke on January 10, 1979, at age seventy-two.
