= Charles L. Bartholomew =

American cartoonist (1869–1949)

Charles Bartholomew
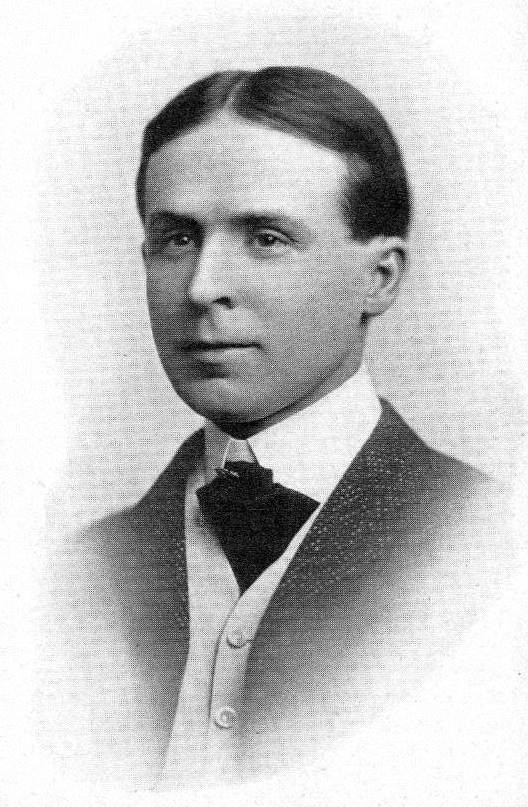
- A young Charles Bartholomew
- Born: February 10, 1869; Chariton, Iowa
- Died: February 15, 1949
- Education: Iowa State College (now Iowa State University)

Charles Lewis Bartholomew (February 10, 1869 – February 15, 1949) was an American editorial cartoonist, more commonly known as "Bart". He is most well known for his daily cartoons published by the Minneapolis Journal.

== Early life and education ==
Bartholomew was born February 10, 1869, in Chariton, Iowa to Col. Orion A. and Mary Smith Bartholomew. He attended the Iowa State College, graduating with a bachelor's in science, and meeting his future wife, Ella Louise Henderson.

== Career ==
He began working as a reporter for the Minneapolis Journal before becoming one of the first daily editorial cartoonists in the world in the late 1890s.

From 1899 to 1915, he produced an editorial cartoon almost every day, usually published on the front page. His cartoons were reproduced in newspapers around the world, as well as the American and European Review of Reviews. The subject of his cartoons ran the gamut from the Spanish–American War to local Minnesota politics and weather. During his time at the Journal, he also drew a number of Saturday cartoon strips, and worked as a children's book illustrator.

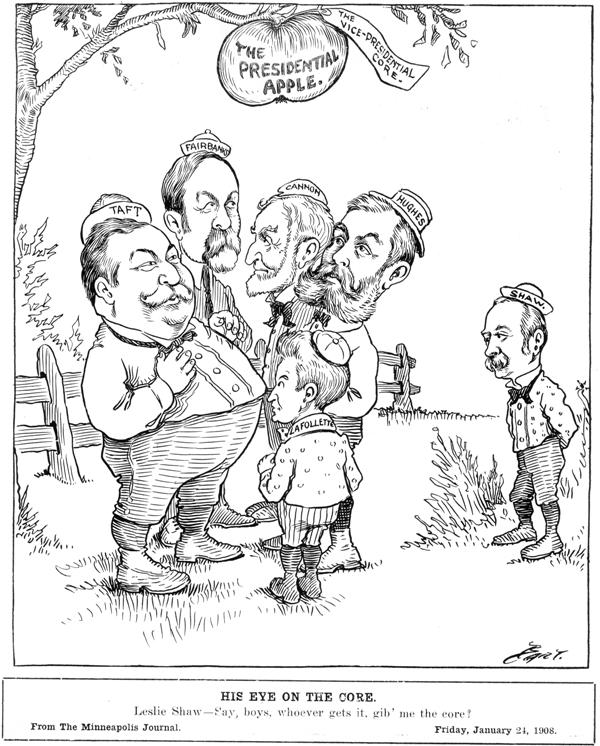
A Charles Bartholomew political cartoon from 1908, it depicts the contenders for the 1908 Republican presidential nomination.

== Later life and death ==
After retiring from the Minneapolis Journal, Bartholomew became the dean of the Federal School of Illustrating and Cartooning, where he give large lecture-style chalk talks for students and everyday citizens. The Federal School of Illustrating and Cartooning is now better known as Art Instruction Schools, famous for its Draw Me! advertisements on matchbooks and in magazines.

In addition to his lectures, Bartholomew organized Bart Supplies art supply store, wrote and edited a dozen textbooks on illustrating and cartooning, and authored six illustrated children's books.

He died on February 15, 1949, in Minneapolis.

== Bibliography ==
- Cartoons of the Spanish–American War by Bart. Minneapolis, Minn.: The Journal printing company 1899.
- Chalk Talk and Crayon Presentation; a Handbook of Practice and Performance in Pictorial Expression of Ideas. Chicago: Frederick J. Drake and Co., 1922.
- Expansion, Being Bart's Best Cartoons for 1899: Taken from the Minneapolis Journal. 1900.
- Illustrating and Cartooning. 1923. With Joseph Almars.
- Modern Illustrating: Including Cartooning. 1927. With Joseph Almars.
- Prairie Gold. Chicago: The Reilly & Britton Co.,1917.
- A World of Trouble. Minneapolis, Minn.: Journal Print. Co., 1901
