= The Sea Around Us (film) =

1953 film

- Film poster for The Sea Around Us
- Directed by: Irwin Allen (uncredited)
- Written by: Irwin Allen
- Based on: The Sea Around Us; 1951 novel by Rachel L. Carson
- Produced by: Irwin Allen
- Narrated by: Don Forbes; Theodore von Eltz
- Edited by: Frederic Knudtson; Doane Harrison (as Dean Harrison)
- Music by: Paul Sawtell
- Production company: Irwin Allen Productions
- Distributed by: RKO Radio Pictures
- Release date: July 7, 1953
- Running time: 62 minutes
- Country: United States
- Language: English

The Sea Around Us is a 1953 American documentary film written and produced by Irwin Allen, based on the book of the same name by Rachel L. Carson. It won the Academy Award for Best Documentary Feature.

== Plot ==
The documentary explores the world's oceans. After an introduction about the formation of the seas and human water use, it focuses on microscopic life in the oceans. The food chain is illustrated using diatoms, which serve as food for crustaceans. Footage of brightly colored sea snakes follows.

== Cast ==
- Don Forbes as Narrator
- Theodore von Eltz as Narrator
