= Roland Clark (painter) =

American painter

- Born: April 2, 1874; New Rochelle, New York, United States
- Died: April 13, 1957 (aged 83); Norwalk, Connecticut, United States
- Occupation: Painter

Roland Clark (April 2, 1874 – April 13, 1957) was an American painter. His work was part of the painting event in the art competition at the 1932 Summer Olympics. Clark specialized in painting waterfowl. He produced the March 1927 cover of Field & Stream
