= Minnesota Aviation Hall of Fame =

Minnesota Aviation Hall of Fame, Inc. is a nonprofit corporation, recognized by the State of Minnesota as a means of honoring aviation pioneers (both living and deceased) within the state.

The Minnesota Aviation Hall of Fame collects and maintains a biographical file on each significant Minnesota aviation figure. These files include interview tapes, photos and other memorabilia.

Replicas of the award plaques given to the Minnesota Aviation Hall of Fame inductees are on display in the Wings of the North Air Museum located near the Flying Cloud Airport control tower in Eden Prairie, Minnesota. More than 200 Hall of Fame Inductee plaques are displayed.

== See also ==
- North American aviation halls of fame
- American Combat Airman Hall of Fame
- Western Canada Aviation Museum
- Cirrus Aircraft
