= The Sea Around Us =

1951 book by Rachel Carson

- First edition
- Author: Rachel Carson
- Cover artist: 'the Strimbans'
- Language: English
- Series: Sea trilogy
- Subject: Marine biology and history
- Genre: Nature writing
- Publisher: Oxford
- Publication date: July 1951 (previously serialized in part)
- Publication place: United States
- Media type: Print
- Preceded by: Under the Sea Wind
- Followed by: The Edge of the Sea

The Sea Around Us is a prize-winning and best-selling book by the American marine biologist Rachel Carson, first published as a whole by Oxford University Press in 1951. It reveals the science and poetry of the sea while ranging from its primeval beginnings to the latest scientific probings. Often described as "poetic," it was Carson's second published book and the one that launched her into the public eye and a second career as a writer and conservationist; in retrospect it is counted the second book of her so-called sea trilogy, including Under the Sea-Wind and The Edge of the Sea.

The Sea Around Us won both the 1952 National Book Award for Nonfiction and a Burroughs Medal in nature writing. It remained on the New York Times Best Seller List for 86 weeks and it has been translated into 28 languages.

== History ==
Simon & Schuster had published her first book Under the Sea Wind in 1941; it was reviewed favorably but it sold poorly. Carson initially planned to call the sequel Return to the Sea, and began writing in 1948, just after hiring Marie Rodell as her literary agent. Carson began by writing a single chapter (what would be "The Birth of an Island") along with a detailed outline, which Rodell used to pitch the book to publishers. During research for the book, Carson met with a number of oceanographers to discuss current research. Carson and Rodell had little initial success with magazines as outlets for the islands chapter, nor for a second chapter titled "Another Beachhead." In April 1949, with about a third of the chapters complete, Rodell began trying to find a publisher for the entire book. By June she had arranged a contract with Oxford University Press that promised completion of the manuscript by March 1, 1950. Carson continued to write and research through 1949 and into 1950, despite unexpected health and financial difficulties. In part the research involved a trip aboard a U.S. Fish and Wildlife Service ship, Albatross III. After revising the completion date, Carson completed the manuscript in June 1950. By that time, several periodicals (The New Yorker, Science Digest, and The Yale Review) were interested in publishing some of the chapters.

External audio
- Books and Authors Luncheon: Rachel Carson, 1951, Carson speaks from 3:00 to 20:15, WNYC

Nine of fourteen chapters were serialized in The New Yorker beginning on June 2, 1951, and the book was published on July 2 by Oxford University Press. The serialization created a very large popular response, and the book was the subject of the feature review in The New York Times Book Review the day before publication. One chapter ("The Birth of an Island") was published in The Yale Review; it won the George Westinghouse Science Writing prize from the American Association for the Advancement of Science.

== Critical reception ==
After the book's release, Carson was inundated with an unexpected volume of fan mail and media attention. She was soon the object of attention from "the literary crowd," and because of a subsequent condensation in Reader's Digest, a broad general audience as well. The book sold more than 250,000 copies in 1951, in addition to the condensation and excerpts published elsewhere.

== Adaptations ==
A film version was filmed in 1952 and released in 1953; it won the 1953 Oscar for Best Documentary (though Carson was extremely disappointed with the script and would never sell film rights to her work again).

== See also ==
- Sea Around Us Project
