= Richard Bishop (painter) =

American painter

Richard Evett Bishop
- Born: May 30, 1887; Syracuse, New York, United States
- Died: February 1975; Plymouth Meeting, Pennsylvania, United States
- Occupation: Painter

Richard Evett Bishop (May 30, 1887 – February 1975) was an American painter. He was born in Syracuse, New York. His work was part of the painting event in the art competition at the 1932 Summer Olympics.
