= Robert W. Hines =

American artist

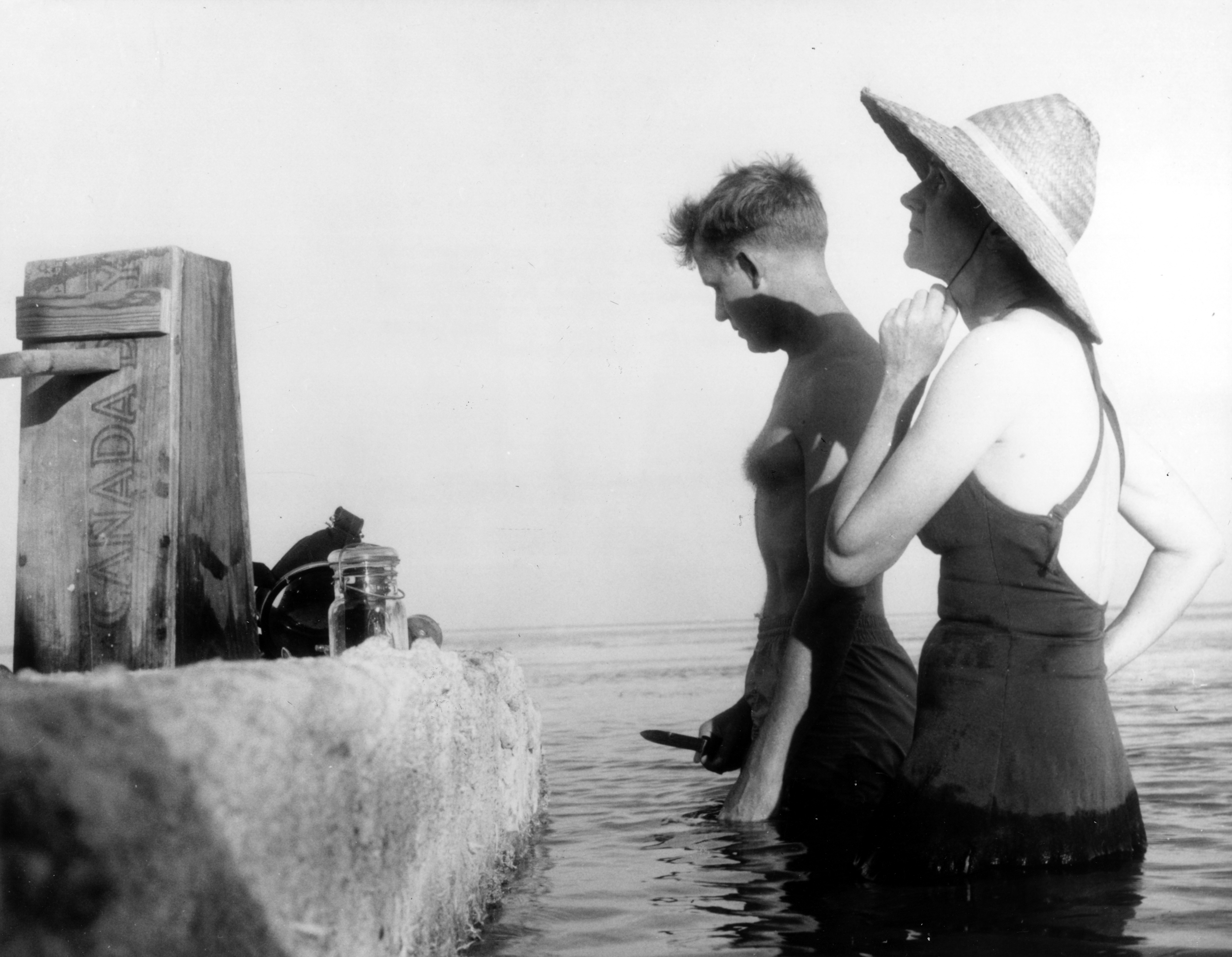
Hines with Rachel Carson

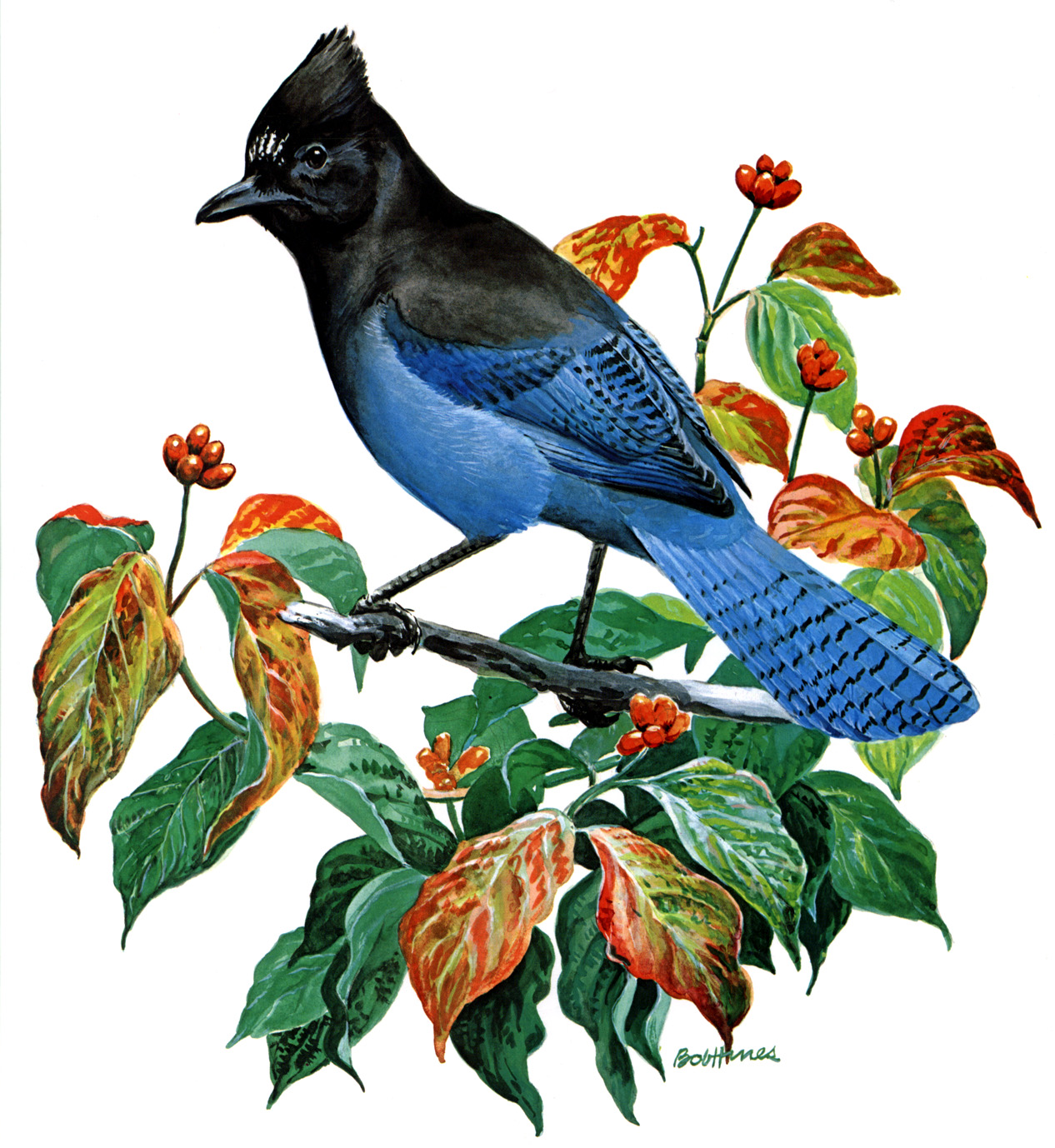
Steller's Jay by Hines

Hines and Rachel Carson conduct research in the Florida Keys, c. 1955

Robert W. Hines (1912-1994), was an American wildlife artist who had a long career with the United States Fish and Wildlife Service.

Born in Columbus, Ohio, Hines had virtually no formal training in art or in wildlife science, yet by the age of twenty-seven he was working as staff artist with the Ohio Division of Wildlife, and in 1947 (or 1948) he accepted a similar position with the United States Fish and Wildlife Service (USFWS). He illustrated many works for the USFWS, including Ducks at a Distance, Migration of Birds, Fifty Birds of Town and City, Wildlife Portrait Series (including Song Birds and Alaska). His illustrations were also used in such works as Wildlife in America by Peter Matthiessen, Ducks, Geese, and Swans of North America (both the Bellrose edition and the new 2014 edition by Guy Baldassarre), Runes of the North by Sigurd F. Olson and in Rachel Carson's Under the Sea Wind.
