= Daniel Smith (artist) =

American painter

Daniel Smith is an American painter who resides in Bozeman, Montana. He is known best for his realistic wildlife portrayals.

== Legacy ==
Painting full-time for over twenty years, the artist's works are in collections including The Hiram Blauvelt Art Museum, Leigh Yawkey Woodson Art Museum, and The Wildlife Experience. Smith is in the annual Western Visions exhibit at the National Museum of Wildlife Art and Masters of the American West exhibit at the Autry National Center. He has been awarded by the Society of Animal Artists. Through his art, the artist endorses and aids many conservation efforts. Nature is the sole inspiration for his fruitful career.
