= List of wildlife artists =

This list of wildlife artists is a list for any notable wildlife artist, wildlife painter, wildlife photographer, other wildlife artist, society of wildlife artists, museum, or exhibition of wildlife art, worldwide.

== A ==
- John Abbot
- Jackson Miles Abbott
- Jacob Bates Abbott
- Joy Adamson
- Jacques-Laurent Agasse
- Richard Ansdell
- John James Audubon
- John Woodhouse Audubon

== B ==
- Don Balke
- John Banovich
- Peter Barrett
- William Bartram
- Robert Bateman
- William Holbrook Beard
- Frank Benson
- William D. Berry
- Thomas Bewick
- Thierry Bisch
- Steve Bloom
- Karl Blossfeldt
- Rosa Bonheur
- Carl Brenders
- Rembrandt Bugatti
- John Philip Busby

== C ==
- Mark Catesby
- Raymond Ching
- James L. Clark
- John Clymer
- Guy Coheleach
- Simon Combes
- William T. Cooper

== D ==
- Thomas Aquinas Daly
- Gerald Curtis Delano
- B. L. Driscoll
- Jan Dungel
- Brian Lee Durfee
- Gerald Durrell

== E ==
- Eric Ennion

== F ==
- Melanie Fain
- Al Feldstein
- Walton Ford
- Charles Fracé
- Louis Agassiz Fuertes
- Alexander Fussell

== G ==
- Robert Gillmor
- Luther Goldman
- Elizabeth Gould
- John Gould
- Peter Benjamin Graham
- Andrew J. Grayson
- Katrina van Grouw

== H ==
- Ernst Haeckel
- Ray Harm
- Charley Harper
- Jim Hautman
- Joe Hautman
- Robert Hautman
- Robert W. Hines
- Gary Hodges
- Alan M Hunt
- Lynn Bogue Hunt

== I ==
- Terry Isaac

== J ==
- Eric Jablonowski
- Francis Lee Jaques
- Louis Paul Jonas
- Genevieve Estelle Jones

== K ==
- John Gerrard Keulemans
- Don Kloetzke
- Charles R. Knight
- Frank Knight
- Jörg Kühn
- Friedrich Wilhelm Kuhnert

== L ==
- Edwin Landseer
- Fenwick Lansdowne
- Bonnie Latham
- Karen Latham
- Rebecca Latham
- Edward Lear
- Bruno Liljefors
- M. Bernard Loates
- George Edward Lodge
- Blythe Loutit

== M ==
- Hamish Mackie
- Ustad Mansur
- Kathleen McArthur
- Stanley Meltzoff
- Maria Sibylla Merian
- Ernie Mills
- Lanford Monroe
- Gustav Mützel

== N ==
- Stephen D. Nash

== O ==
- Bill Oddie

== P ==
- Roger Tory Peterson
- Michael Poliza
- François Pompon
- Greg Poole
- Rien Poortvliet

== R ==
- Terry Redlin
- Henry Constantine Richter
- Arthur Spencer Roberts
- Derek Robertson
- Chris Rose
- Christopher Ross
- Frédéric Rossif
- Carl Rungius
- John Ruthven

== S ==
- Sam Savitt
- J. Michael Scott
- Peter Scott
- Robert Scriver
- Keith Shackleton
- David Shepherd
- David Allen Sibley
- Wladyslaw Siwek
- Richard Sloan
- Joseph Smit
- Anthony Smith
- Daniel Smith
- Robert Summers
- George Miksch Sutton
- William Swainson

== T ==
- Arthur Fitzwilliam Tait
- Daniel Taylor
- Archibald Thorburn
- Clarence Tillenius
- David Tipling
- Édouard Traviès
- Peter Trusler
- Charles Tunnicliffe
- Dick Twinney

== V ==
- Juan Varela

== W ==
- D. Ian M. Wallace
- Donald Watson
- Alexander Wilson
- Joseph Wolf
- Art Wolfe

== Z ==
- Julie Zickefoose
