= Robert Gilmour =

Robert Gilmour may refer to:

- Robert Gordon Gilmour (1857–1939), British army officer
- Robert Gilmour (footballer), Scottish footballer
- Robert Gilmour (journalist) (1831–1902), Scottish-New Zealander editor, newspaper proprietor and journalist

== See also ==
- Robert Gillmor (1936–2022), British author and artist
- Robert Gilmore (disambiguation)
