= John Philip Busby =

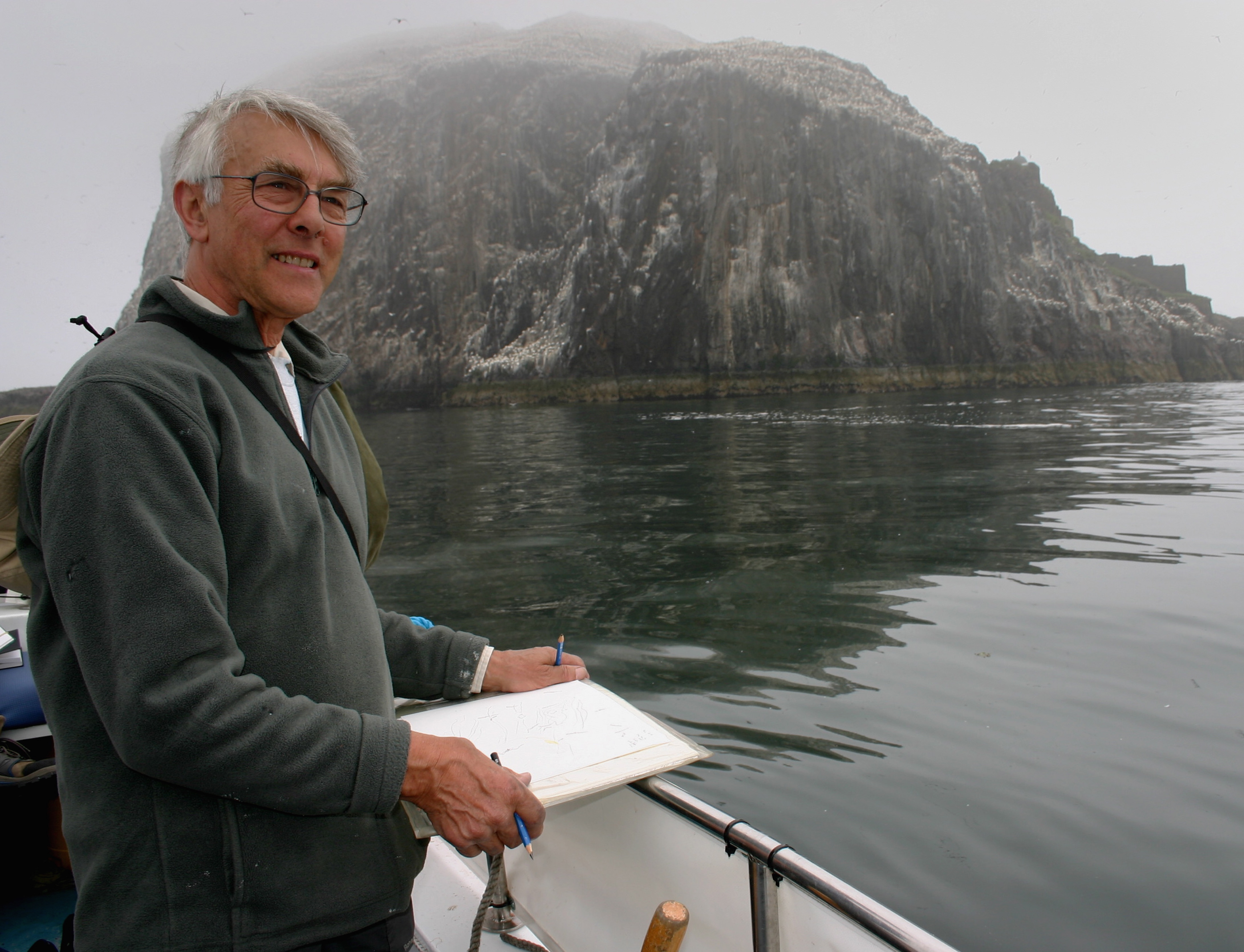
- John Busby at Bass Rock in 2005
- Born: 1928; Bradford
- Died: 3 June 2015 (aged 86–87)
- Occupation: Visual artist, illustrator, teacher, writer
- Website: johnbusbyartist.co.uk

John Philip Busby (1928– 3 June 2015) RSW RSA was an influential artist whose close observation of nature and dedication to drawing from life inspired several generations of leading wildlife artists.

== Biography ==
John Philip Busby was born in Bradford in 1928 and attended Ilkley Grammar School. After National Service, he studied at Leeds College of Art and then at Edinburgh College of Art, ECA, where he was awarded post-graduate and major travel scholarships. On return from France and Italy he was invited to join the staff of ECA, where he taught drawing and painting from 1956 until 1988. In 1959 he was commissioned to paint the mural Christ in Glory in the Scottish Episcopal Church, St. Columbas-by-the-Castle in Edinburgh which was influenced by his travels and informed by his personal Christian faith.

Busby was a member of the Royal Scottish Academy of Arts and Architecture (RSA) and the Royal Scottish Society of Painters in Watercolour, RSW, and served as president of the Society of Scottish Artists, from 1976 to 1979. A life-long bird watcher and naturalist, (at age 17 he was at the inaugural meeting of the Wharfedale Naturalists Society in 1945) he was a founder member of the Society of Wildlife Artists, SWLA.

Having led courses in Switzerland, Crete, the Falklands and Galapagos Islands, in Orkney and at Nature in Art in Gloucestershire, in 1989 Busby began a Seabird Drawing course based at North Berwick which has continued each year since, attracting participants from many parts of the world. He took part in projects with the Artists for Nature Foundation (ANF) in Holland, Poland, Spain, Ireland, India, Portugal and Israel, and in SWLA/Forestry Commission projects in the New Forest and in the oak woods in the west of Scotland. In 1991 he was filmed in Shetland for the STV production Portrait of the Wild – Summer.

Busby illustrated over 35 books about birds and animals, mostly about behaviour, ranging from seabirds to tigers, garden birds to otters, and also a book of poems Wild Horses by Kenneth Steven. He created many of the illustrations in The RSPB Anthology of Wildlife Poetry. His own books ranged from a study of the art of Eric Ennion (The Living Birds of Eric Ennion 1982 Victor Gollancz), two editions of Drawing Birds for the RSPB (1986 and 2004), the limited edition Nature Drawings (1992 Arlequin Press), the more autobiographical Land Marks and Sea Wings (2005 Wildlife Art Gallery), and Lines from Nature (2016, Langford Press published posthumously). The book which summed up his whole approach to nature and art was the 2013 Looking at Birds – An Antidote to Field Guides where he suggested that aspiring artists (and birdwatchers) could 'twitch' a single species, maybe "collecting shapes of blackbird".

In 2009 Busby was declared Master Wildlife Artist by the Leigh Yawkey Woodson Art Museum in Wisconsin USA.

A much celebrated wildlife artist, Busby was also a dedicated landscape painter whose work was often executed in bold colours, in styles ranging from highly representational to near abstract. Views of the land from above – a bird's eye view – seemed to fascinate him and the expansiveness of the sky also held great appeal, becoming very nearly the sole subject of some paintings. Birds feature in many of the paintings and it's clear that the concept of habitat and territory was a rich seam of study. One long running series was of the rockpools at Tyninghame in East Lothian. The interplay of shapes, whether of man-made irrigation circles or transient cloudscapes featured often. 'Landscape in a Granite Rock II' was recreated as a tapestry by the Dovecot Studios in Edinburgh.

Busby exhibited widely both at home and abroad and had a major retrospective exhibition at Bradford City Art Gallery in 1999/2000. A retrospective exhibition was held at Nature in Art, in August 2015, and two major exhibitions were held in June 2016 at the Royal Scottish Academy and concurrently at The Scottish Gallery. An exhibition entitled John Busby; Friends and Influences was the final exhibition held at the Wildlife Art Gallery, Lavenham, in November and December 2016. During the Edinburgh Art Festival in August 2019 the Open Eye Gallery, Edinburgh devoted their whole space to his paintings from the 1950s to the 2010s.

Busby lived near Ormiston in East Lothian and was married to the mezzo-soprano and singing teacher Joan Busby. Music was an abiding passion. He died in Edinburgh in June 2015.

== Bibliography ==
- Busby, John (1982). The Living Birds of Eric Ennion. Victor Gollancz.
- Busby, John (1986). Drawing Birds, 1st Ed. Royal Society for the Protection of Birds (RSPB).
- Busby, John (1988). Birds in Mallorca. Helm
- Busby, John (1993). Nature Drawings. Arlequin Press
- Busby, John (2004). Drawing Birds, 2nd Ed. RSPB
- Busby, John (2005). Land Marks and Sea Wings. Wildlife Art Gallery, Lavenham.
- Busby, John (2013). Looking at Birds, an antidote to field guides. Langford Press.
- Busby, John (2016). Lines from Nature. Langford Press.

In addition there are over 35 books illustrated in whole or in part by Busby

=== Book Reviews – Lines from Nature ===
British Birds Magazine, June 2016

Rare Bird Alert website

== Obituaries ==
The Scotsman, Edinburgh

The Times, London

== Tributes ==
Society of Wildlife Artists
