= Conservation Foundation =

The Conservation Foundation may refer to:

- Australian Conservation Foundation (ACF)
- African Conservation Foundation
- Conservation Foundation, UK
- Conservation Foundation (New York), founded 1948, merged into the World Wide Fund for Nature in 1990
- The Conservation Foundation (Illinois), formerly the Forest Foundation of DuPage County
