= Alan Hunt =

Alan Hunt may refer to:

- Alan Hunt (academic), British academic
- Alan Hunt (politician) (1927–2013), Australian politician
- Alan Hunt (English cricketer) (born 1968), English cricketer
- Alan Hunt (New Zealand cricketer) (born 1959), New Zealand cricketer
- Alan Hunt (speedway rider) (1925–1957), British speedway rider
- Alan Hunt (diplomat) (born 1941), former British diplomat
- Alan M. Hunt (born 1947), British wildlife artist

== See also ==
- Alan Hunte (born 1970), former professional rugby league footballer
- Allan Hunt (born 1945), American actor
- Allen Hunt (born 1964), American talk radio host
- Allen Funt (1914–1999), of Candid Camera fame
