= Siwek =

Siwek may refer to the Polish Siwki (Easter tradition) but is also a surname of Polish origin. Notable people with the surname include:

- Agnieszka Siwek (born 1962), athlete
- Carol A. Siwek (born 1938), American politician
- Wladyslaw Siwek (1907–1983), artist
