= Robert Gilmore =

Robert Gilmore is the name of:

- Bob Gilmore (1961–2015), musicologist
- Robert Gilmore of the band Pulley

== See also ==
- Robert Gillmor (1936–2022), artist and ornithologist
- Robert Gilmour (disambiguation)
- Gilmore (surname)
