= Katrina van Grouw =

British science author and illustrator (born 1965)

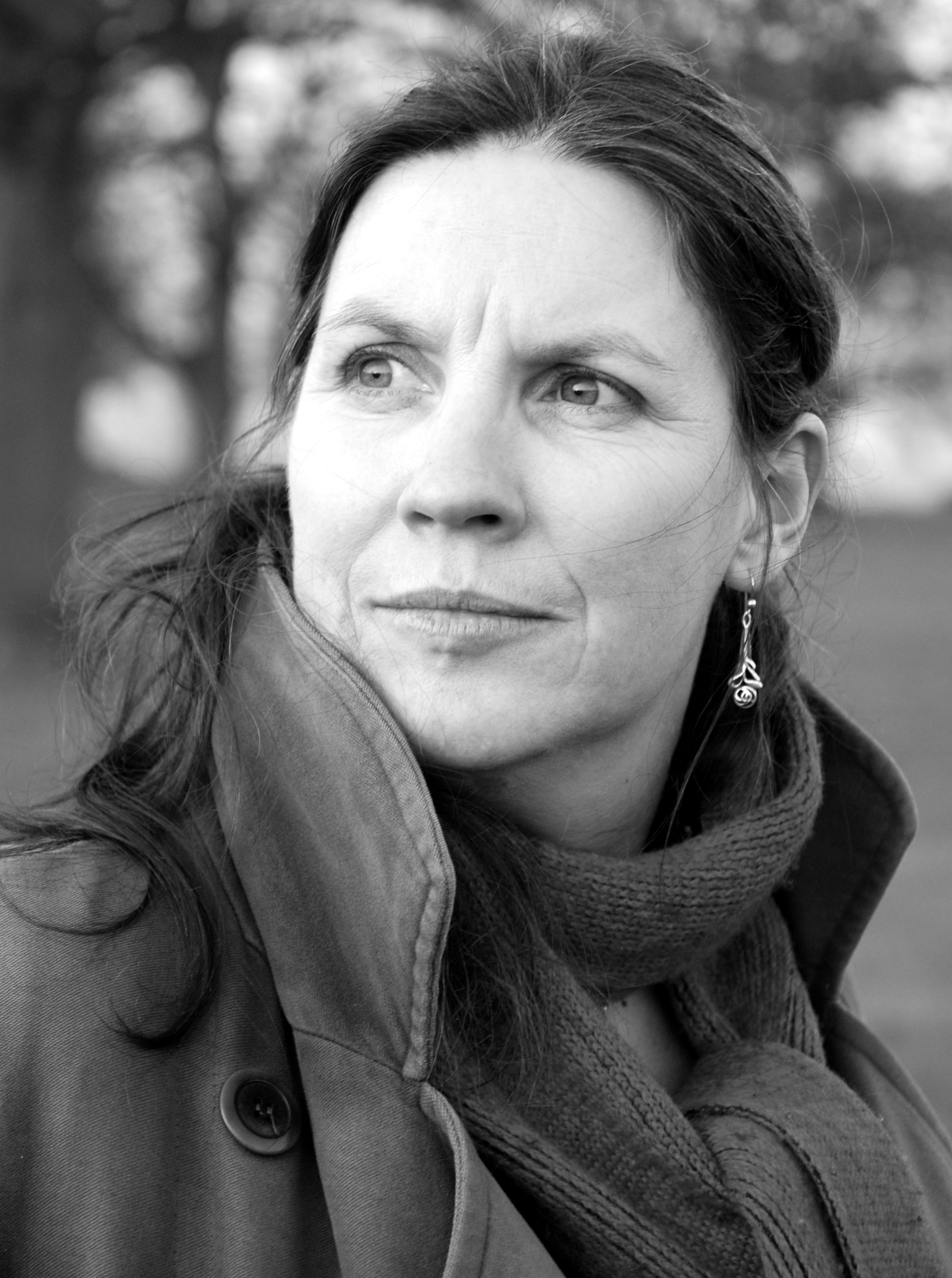
- van Grouw in 2012
- Born: 1965 (age 60–61)
- Education: Royal College of Art
- Website: http://unfeatheredbird.com

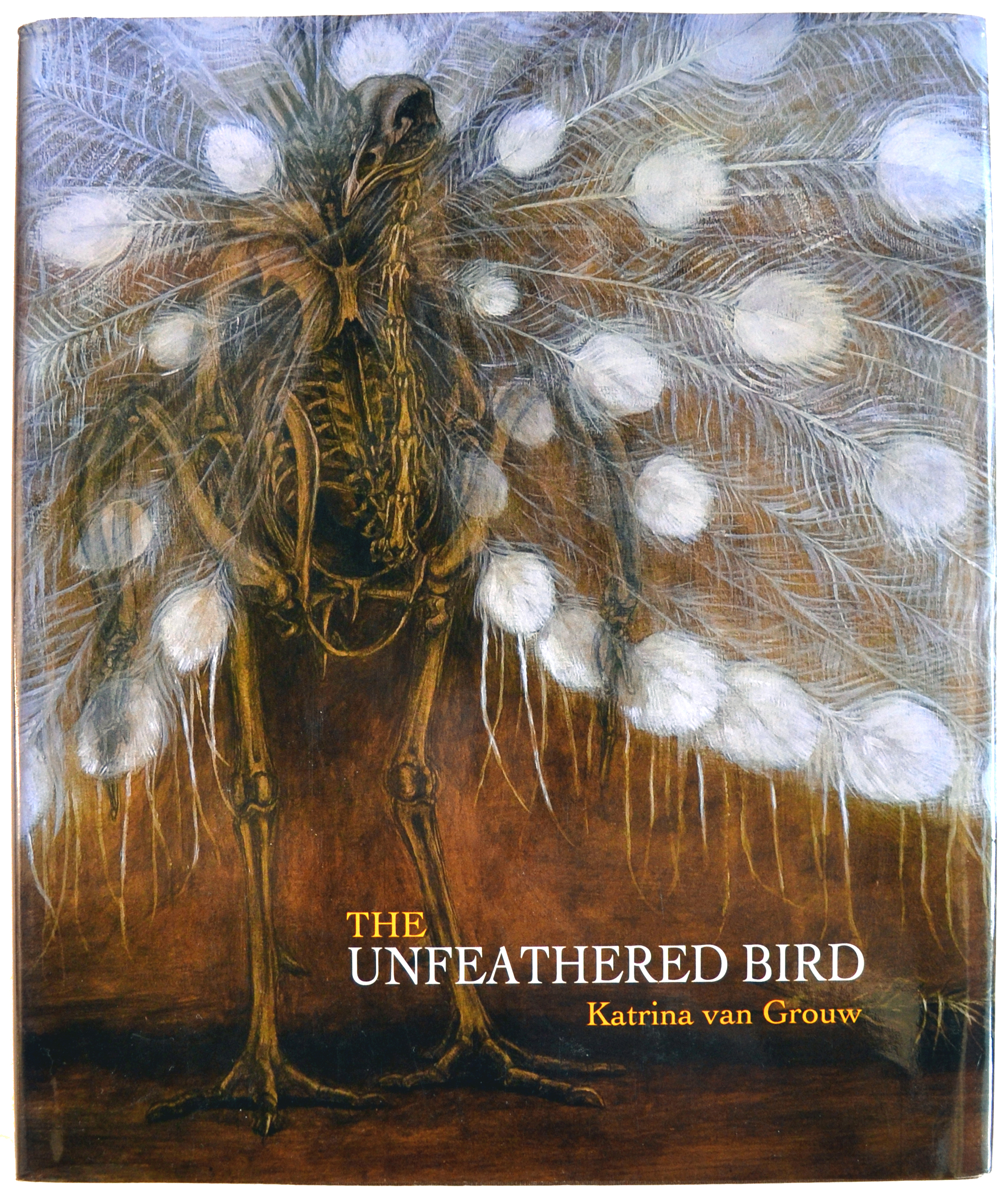
Front cover of the book The Unfeathered Bird by Katrina van Grouw.

Katrina van Grouw (born 1965) is a British science author, illustrator and fine artist, best known for her illustrated natural science books The Unfeathered Bird and Unnatural Selection published by Princeton University Press. She has degrees in Fine Art and Natural History Illustration. Van Grouw is a self-taught ornithologist with an interest in comparative anatomy, evolution, and the history of natural sciences.

== Early life and education ==
Katrina van Grouw was born in Pontypool, South Wales in 1965, adopted, and raised as Katrina Cook in Aylesbury, Buckinghamshire. (She became known by her current name after her marriage to Hein van Grouw, in 2009.) Van Grouw states that her prodigious drawing ability led to artistic hothousing during her school education which compromised her academic achievements.

She gained a BA in Fine Art, specialising in printmaking, from the University of Plymouth (at that time Exeter College of Art and Design) in 1990, and an MA in Natural History Illustration from the Royal College of Art in 1992 with a research thesis on bird anatomy.

== Fine art ==
In 1993, van Grouw moved to a cottage in rural Devon and began her career as a self-employed fine artist, specialising in large scale drypoints—a form of intaglio printmaking—of natural history subjects. She also taught adult education classes in drypoint, and lectured in printmaking and illustration to undergraduate students at the University of Plymouth, Chelsea College of Art and Design, and Falmouth College of Art and Design. She was an elected member of the Society of Wildlife Artists, held numerous open and solo exhibitions, and won several awards including the Birdwatch Artist of the Year Award in 1997 (black and white section) and 1998 (overall winner), the Wildlife Art Gallery Award in 1993 and 1996, and the PJC Drawing Award in 2014. From 1996 her subject matter and preferred medium changed to large graphite drawings of geological formations.

Fine art was put aside during the final push to write and illustrate The Unfeathered Bird, and after its completion van Grouw found that producing illustrated books now "ticked all creative and intellectual boxes".

== History of natural history illustration ==
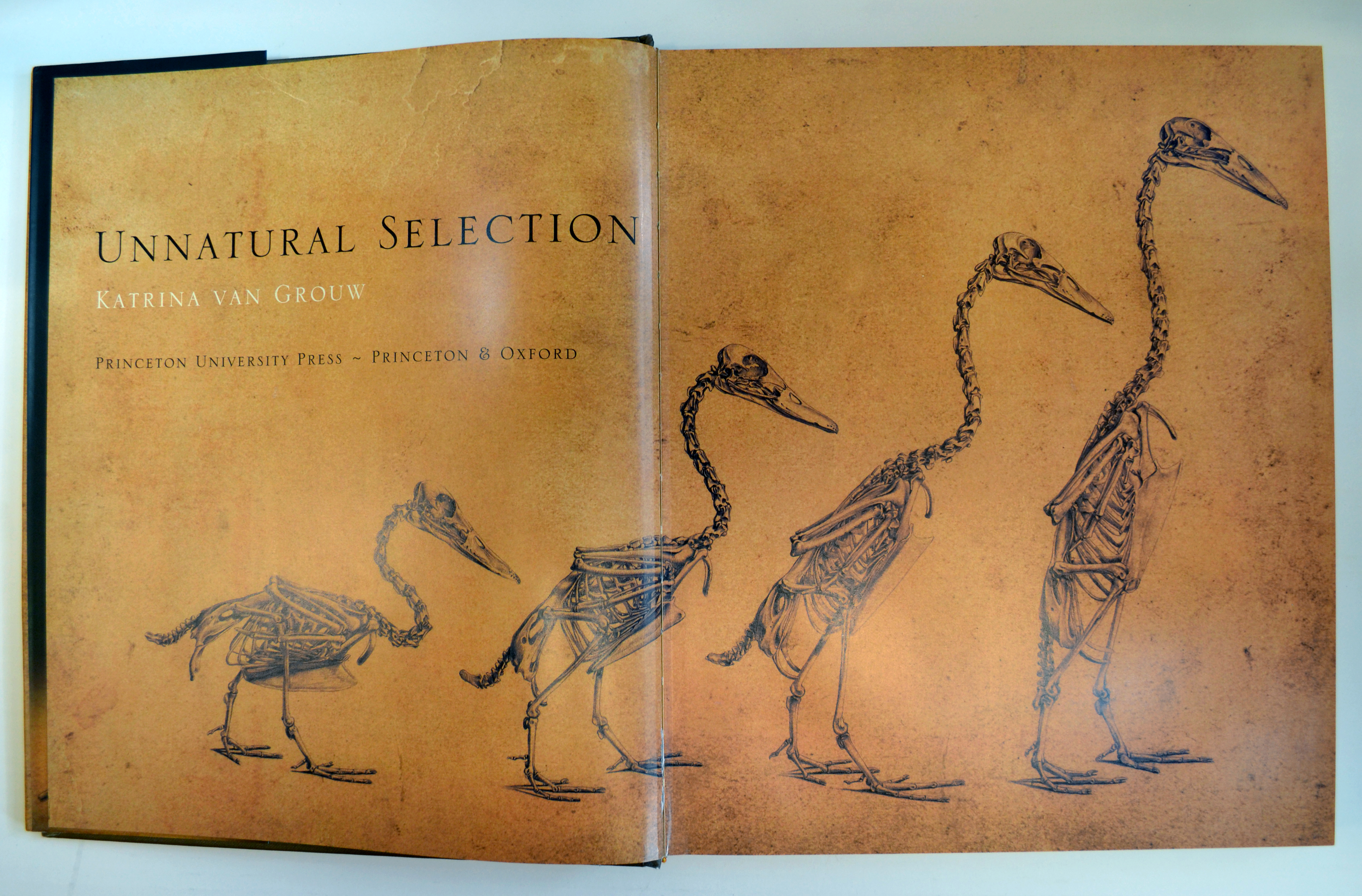
The title page from Unnatural Selection by Katrina van Grouw. The image, showing the progressive changes in posture to create the Indian Runner Duck from its wild ancestor, is called 'The Ascent of Mallard'.

During her education Katrina van Grouw developed a specialist interest in historical illustrated natural history publications and the printing techniques used to create them. John James Audubon's The Birds of America, Robert John Thornton's Temple of Flora, George Stubbs' The Anatomy of the Horse, and the printing by Alecto Historical Editions of Banks' Florilegium in the 1980s were particularly influential.

Van Grouw has continued to write, consult, give talks and demonstrations, and national media broadcasts about historical natural history art. Projects have included selecting images and writing text for the British Library's Turning the Pages virtual book of Audubon's The Birds of America; appearing in Episode 1 of the BBC TV program The Secret of Drawing in 2005 hosted by Andrew Graham Dixon (again talking about The Birds of America); and demonstrating intaglio printing in a short film about Sydney Parkinson, the artist on James Cook's HMS Endeavour voyage, for the British Natural History Museum. She was a freelance consultant for the Natural History Museum's 2011 edition of The Birds of America and fact checker for Birds: The Art of Ornithology (and Great Birds of Britain and Europe) by Jonathan Elphick. Van Grouw regularly carries out identifications of birds depicted in historic Indian and Islamic paintings for Simon Ray and other London auction houses, and writes accompanying text for their sales catalogues. She has given frequent talks about printing techniques and their history in natural history publications at the Natural History Museum's libraries including the Rothschild Library at Tring and Rare Books Room at the NHM South Kensington, London.

In 2007, van Grouw was commissioned by Quercus to author Birds an illustrated history of birds in art, choosing to focus on the biographies of the artists and the stories surrounding the creation and publication of their works. She also sourced the images and drew up the preliminary designs for the book.

== Ornithology ==
Katrina van Grouw has been passionate about natural history and a keen birdwatcher throughout her life. She qualified as a bird ringer in the 1990s and took part in several long-term ringing expeditions in Africa, South America and the Shetland Islands, She was employed as resident bird ringer at Rutland Water Nature Reserve in 1998.

Her interest in the preparation of museum specimens began as a young child. As an undergraduate student she taught herself to prepare bird study skins, and to clean and assemble skeletons. During this time she formulated her plans to produce The Unfeathered Bird, initially intended as an anatomy guide specifically for artists.

Her preparation skills and knowledge of birds led to her employment as a curator of the ornithological research collections (Bird Group) at the British Natural History Museum in 2003, initially full-time and then in a job-share arrangement with her husband, the Dutch ornithologist and bird breeder Hein van Grouw. Van Grouw states that she was prohibited by a senior manager from undertaking spare time commercial writing or illustration projects, which led to her resignation in 2010 in order to pursue her long-term ambition to create The Unfeathered Bird, "leaving [her] utterly broken". Her husband remained at the museum in her place.

== The Unfeathered Bird ==
The Unfeathered Bird was published in 2013 - twenty five years after its conception. Originally intended to be an anatomy resource for artists, van Grouw was determined that it should accessible to a wide audience with interdisciplinary interests, and spent years seeking a suitable publisher that would allow her vision to be brought to life.

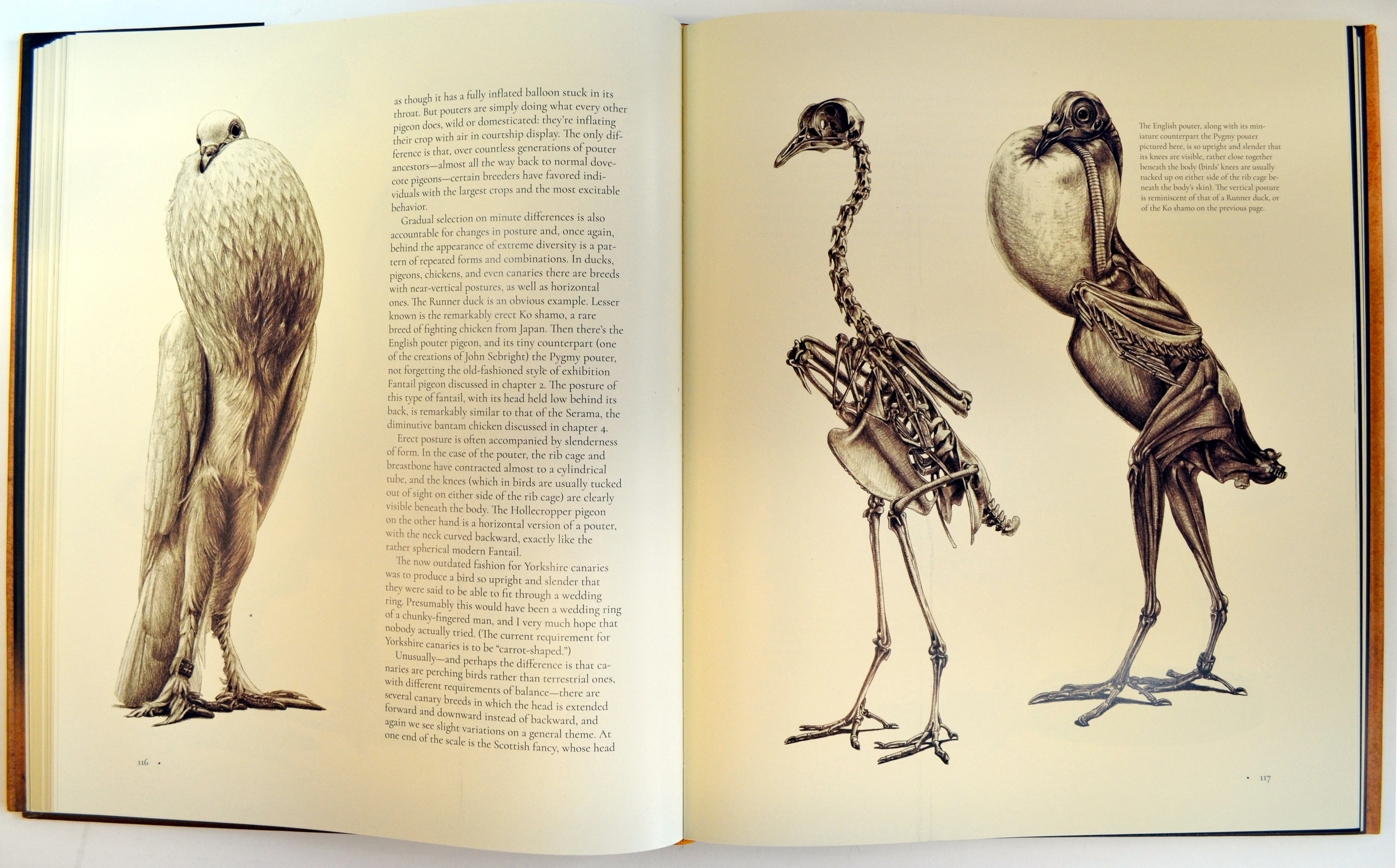
A double page spread from Unnatural Selection showing a domesticated pouter pigeon with its crop inflated in its courtship posture. According to the author's autobiographical public lecture A Very Fine Swan Indeed: Art, Science and 'The Unfeathered Bird', the musculature drawing was achieved by inserting a condom into the throat of the dead pigeon and blowing into it!

According to the author's autobiographic account given in her public lecture, A Very Fine Swan Indeed: Art, Science, and 'The Unfeathered Bird', her successful relationship with Princeton University Press began in 2010 with a chance meeting with the publishers' Executive Editor Robert Kirk in a pub during the British Birdwatching Fair.

One remarkable feature of the book is that it shows skeletons in animated postures as though they were alive and engaged in natural activities. The majority of the illustrations were drawn from skeletons that were cleaned and assembled by her husband at their home, leaving Katrina van Grouw free to concentrate on the illustrations and text. In the book's acknowledgments the author states, "no bird was harmed during the making of this book" before going on to give an exhaustive list of people who donated dead specimens which had died of natural causes, and of museum collections used.

The Unfeathered Bird was received with worldwide critical acclaim from art and science communities alike.

It's dedicated "To Amy" which was the name given to the Mallard skeleton van Grouw cleaned and assembled in 1987 and which sparked off the initial idea for The Unfeathered Bird, leading one reviewer to describe it as "undoubtedly the best ever book to be inspired by a dead duck".

A second and greatly expanded edition of The Unfeathered Bird is currently in production.

== Unnatural Selection ==
The publication of Unnatural Selection in 2018 was timed to commemorate the 150th anniversary of the Variation of Animals and Plants Under Domestication, by Charles Darwin. In the book's acknowledgments the author states that it was produced to thank her husband, Hein van Grouw "a domesticated animal nerd", for his help preparing the skeletons for The Unfeathered Bird, combining his knowledge of selective breeding with her own interest in evolutionary biology. The dedication in the book reads, "To Husband, Naturally" and Hein van Grouw is referred to throughout the book simply as 'Husband'.

It was published by Princeton University Press, once again, and the size and format is consistent with The Unfeathered Bird. In addition to the 80,000+ words of text, the book contains 425 illustrations by the author, who was also responsible for the design and layout of the entire book. It took six years to produce.

== List of published works ==
=== Books ===
Author, Illustrator, and Designer

- The Unfeathered Bird (Princeton University Press, 2013) ISBN 978-0691151342
- Unnatural Selection (Princeton University Press, 2018) ISBN 978-0691157061

Author

- Birds (Quercus, 2007) ISBN 978-1847241993

==== Illustrator ====
- A Field Guide to Smaller Moths of South-east Asia (1994) Gaden Robinson, Kevin Tuck, & Michael Schaffer ISBN 978-9839681130
- Bird Sense (2012) Tim Birkhead ISBN 978-1408830543
- The Mandarin Duck (2013) written by Christopher Lever ISBN 978-1408149638
- The Red Canary (jacket illustration) (2014) written by Tim Birkhead ISBN 978-1408847060

===== Illustrations appearing in other publications =====
- The Wildlife Artist's Handbook (2013) Jackie Garner ISBN 978-1847976079
- Insects in Art (2014) Andrew Tyzack ISBN 978-1847974891
- Twentieth Century Wildlife Art (1986) Nicholas Hammond ISBN 978-0879512217
- Drawing birds (2004) John Busby ISBN 978-0713668162
- Drawing and Painting Birds (2010) Tim Wootton ISBN 978-1847972248
- Illustration: A Theoretical and Contextual Perspective (2017) Alan Male ISBN 978-1474263023
- Die Sinne der Vögel oder Wie es ist ein Vogel zu sein (2018) Tim Birkhead ISBN 978-3-662-55865-2
