= Bisch =

Bisch is a surname. Notable people with the surname include:

- Art Bisch (1926–1958), American racing driver
- Thierry Bisch (born 1953), French artist
- Jorgen Bisch, alternative spelling of Danish writer Jørgen Bitsch (1922–2005)
