= We Are the Champions (disambiguation) =

"We Are the Champions" is a power ballad performed by Queen for their 1977 album News of the World.

We Are the Champions may also refer to:

- We Are the Champions: Final Live in Japan, live concert video of Queen's performance in Tokyo, 1985
- We Are the Champions (British TV series), BBC children's sport competition
- We Are the Champions, a 2011 album by JEFF the Brotherhood
- "We Are the Champions", a 1989 song by Asher D and Daddy Freddy
- We Are the Champions (film), also known as Af banen, a 2005 Danish film
- We Are the Champions (American TV series), a 2020 documentary competition series on Netflix
