= Richard Sloan =

Richard Sloan may refer to:

- Richard Elihu Sloan (1857–1933), territorial governor of Arizona
- Richard Sloan (artist) (1935–2007), American artist
- Richard Sloan, editor of Review of Accounting Studies

== See also ==
- Rick Sloan, American athlete
- Rick Sloane, American cult filmmaker
