= Brenders =

Brenders is a surname. Notable people with the surname include:

- Carl Brenders (born 1937), Belgian naturalist and painter
- Stan Brenders (1904–1969), Belgian jazz pianist and bandleader

== See also ==
- Brender, surname
