= Wallsworth Hall =

Stately home in Gloucester, England

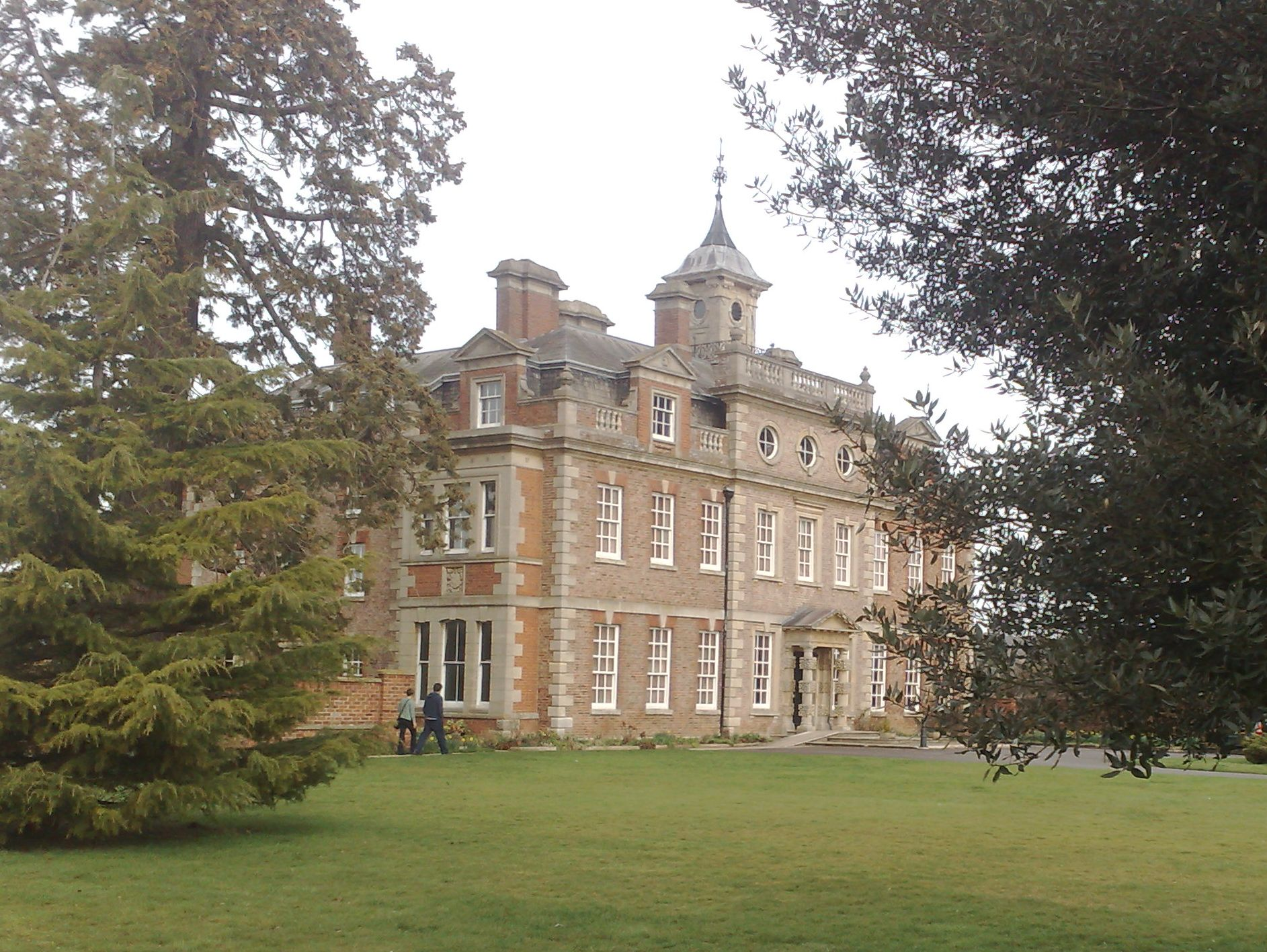
- Wallsworth Hall

- Location in Gloucestershire
- 51°54′20.63″N 02°13′57.46″W
- Location: Sandhurst, Gloucestershire, England

Wallsworth Hall is a stately home in the parish of Sandhurst, Gloucester, England. It is a Grade II* listed building.

The hall was featured in Simon Jenkins' (2004) book 'England's 1000 Best Houses'. The hall was built on the site of a timbered house from the Tudor period soon after 1740 by Samuel Hayward, as a wedding present for his wife, Catherine.

The oldest part of the building faces up towards the side garden and the main front was added a little later. The building still has many of its original features, including the magnificent staircase, which is thought to have been installed in 1753. In 1865 a top floor, new roof, two extensions and the off-centre clock tower were added which updated the building dramatically. In 1903 the whole estate, covering 655 acres (2.65 km^{2}), including land, houses and farms was split up and offered for sale. It was purchased at auction and many improvements were made; after 1943 all properties were put on the market and household items, fixtures and fine pieces of furniture were sold. The Hall was then used as a residential nursery and a training centre for nursery nurses.

After 1953 the house spent much of its time empty, until in 1987 the building was purchased by the Nature in Art trust, a registered charity, which spent 12 months renovating the building and now operates it as an art gallery.

== The Hayward family ==
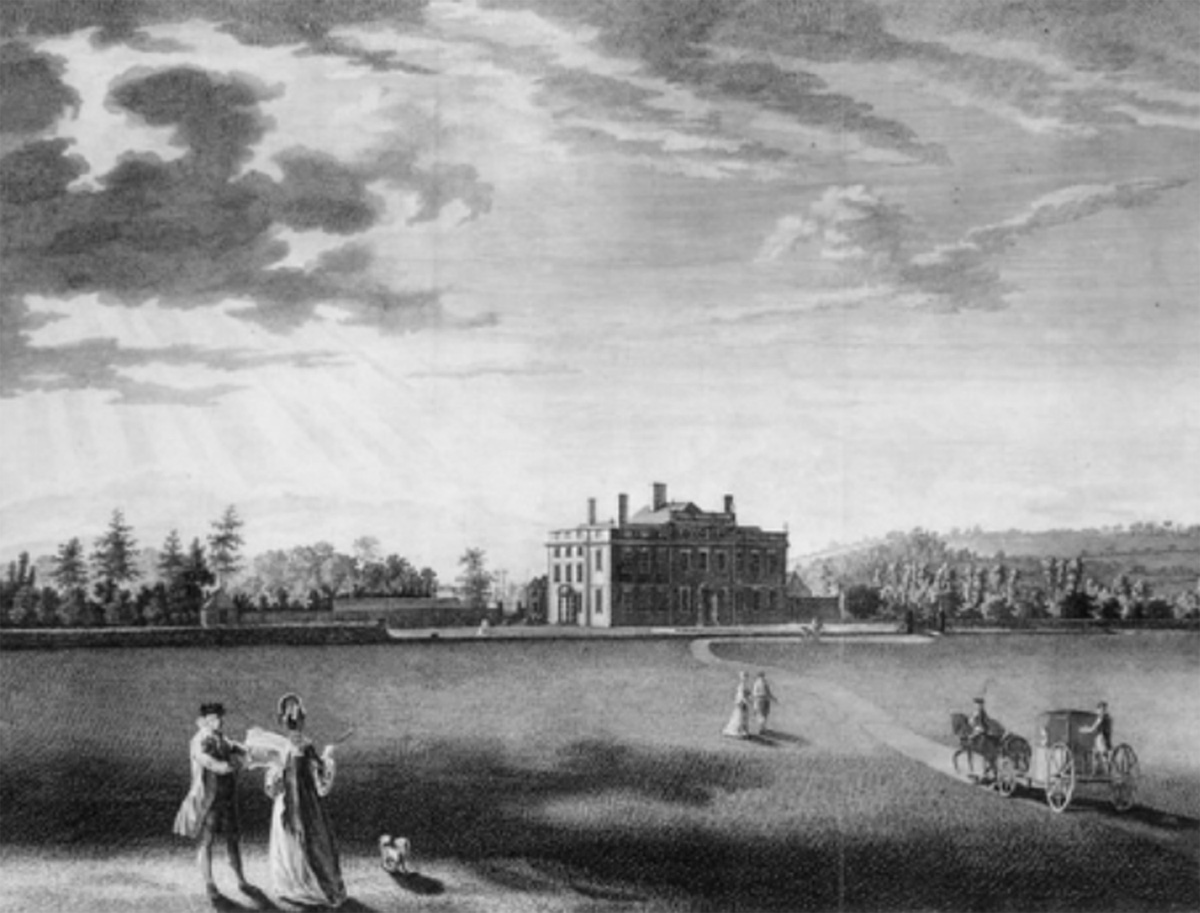
Wallsworth Hall engraving circa 1770 at the time Samuel Hayward and his family lived at the house

Samuel Hayward, who built Wallsworth Hall, was born in 1714. He was a merchant, landowner and magistrate. He married his wife Catherine (1728–1804) in about 1740 and soon after built Wallsworth Hall. The couple had two children, Catherine Augusta born in 1745 and Samuel born in 1757. Their only son Samuel died when he was seven years old and Catherine then became the sole heir.

In 1790 Samuel Hayward died at the age of 76. Catherine his wife then became the proprietor of Wallsworth Hall. She died in 1804 and her son in law Walter Wilkins inherited the house. The daughter Catherine Augusta had married Walter Wilkins in 1777. Their grandson later changed the family name in 1839 to De Winton.

== The De Winton family ==
Walter Wilkins was born in 1741. His father was John Wilkins who was a lawyer and his mother was Sybil Jeffreys. After completing his education William worked for the East India Company in Bengal for fourteen years after which he returned home in 1772 and bought Maesllwch Castle and estate in Radnorshire. In 1796 he was elected to Parliament as the Member for Radnorshire a position he held until his death in 1828.

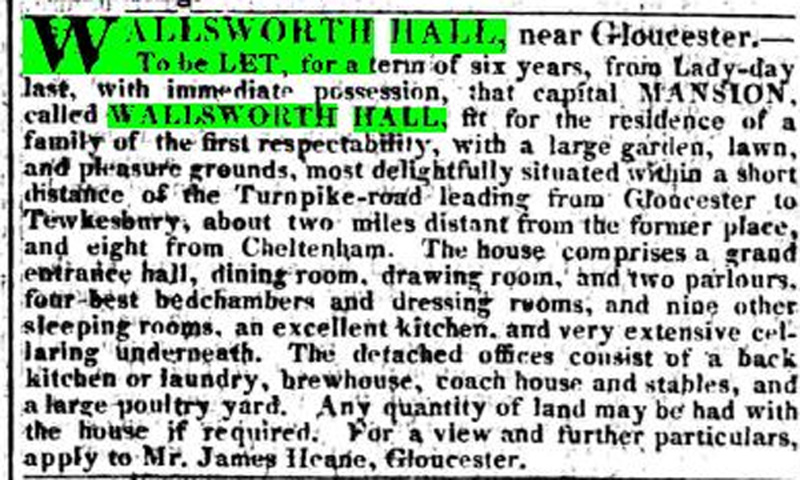
Advertisement for Wallsworth Hall 1822

In 1822 while Walter was still the owner an advertisement for the Hall appeared in a newspaper, describing the hall as:

"The house comprises a grand entrance hall, dining room, drawing room and two parlours, four best bed chambers and dressing rooms and nine other sleeping rooms, an excellent kitchen and very extensive cellaring underneath. The detached offices consist of a back kitchen or laundry, brewhouse, coach house and stables and a large poultry yard."

Walter's son Walter Wilkins (1777 – 1831) inherited Wallsworth Hall and after his death it was inherited by his grandson, Walter Wilkins (1809–1840). It was this grandson who changed the family name by Royal Licence in 1839 to De Winton, a reflection of the family's eponymous ancestor, Robert de Wintona, who built Llanquian Castle.

The line of inheritance for Wallsworth Hall then became fairly complicated. The grandson Walter Wilkins now De Winton (1809–1840) left the house to a distant cousin Walter Hayward De Winton (1807–1842). This branch of the family had also changed their name from Wilkins to De Winton in 1839. Walter Hayward De Winton died young at the age of 35 in 1842 and left the Hall to his father Reverend Walter De Winton of Hay (1772–1851). Reverend De Winton who had married Anna Maria Jacoba Chiappini in 1809 owned Wallsworth Hall until his death in 1851. After his death the house was inherited by his eldest son Thomas De Winton.

Thomas De Winton (1814–1901) married Barbara Peel in 1852 and had seven sons and four daughters. Thomas was a captain in the Royal Artillery and a Justice of the Peace. He lived at Wallsworth Hall for about 50 years and made many improvements. He added a top floor, new roof, two extensions and the off-centre clock tower. He died in 1901 and his wife Barbara died in the following year. In 1903 the estate was divided and the Hall and surrounding grounds were sold to James Dorrington.
