= The Million Dollar Duck (2016 film) =

2016 documentary directed by Brian Golden Davis

The Million Dollar Duck is a 2016 documentary film directed by Brian Golden Davis. The film follows participants in the Federal Duck Stamp contest as they create and submit work, as well as exploring the wider history and culture of the competition.

== Background ==
Duck stamps are admission stamps purchased annually by American hunters prior to hunting for migratory waterfowl. Outside of their use within hunting regulation, duck stamps have a wider appeal to artists and collectors. Initially the illustration on these stamps were provided by cartoonist Ding Darling, however this was later opened up for public submissions. Started in 1949, the Federal Duck Stamp contest is an annual contest that determines the illustration that will be depicted on the following year's duck stamp. Director Brian Golden Davis initially grew interested in the contest after his high school friend's father, Ron Louque, won the contest in 2003. Davis told film review website IndieWire “We were talking about it and he said, ‘My stepdad painted a duck. It got on a stamp, and now we’re set for life.’ That phrase just stuck with me.”

== Synopsis ==
The Million Dollar Duck follows a small number of artists in the 2013 contest - from their initial entry sketches, through to the final contest. Featured artists include Adam Grimm, the youngest ever winner of the contest with his 2000 entry, eccentric multi-media artist Rob McBroom, and two time winner Robert Hautman.

== Reception ==
The Million Dollar Duck won the Audience Award for Documentary Feature and the Jury Award for Documentary Feature at the 2016 Slamdance Film Festival, with the decision statement commenting "artfully shot and edited, with a colorful cast of characters, the film weaves these human stories into the larger picture of how the annual competition has served to create and protect America's many wildlife refuges. It's about more than the duck." The Hollywood Reporter called it a "fascinating and lively documentary".
