= Brian Golden Davis =

American filmmaker and television director

- Born: U.S.
- Education: USC School of Cinematic Arts
- Occupations: Director, writer, editor, cinematographer, producer
- Years active: 2008–present

Brian Golden Davis is an American filmmaker and television director. He is best known for his documentary The Million Dollar Duck and the Netflix series We Are The Champions.

Davis won the Student Academy Award in Bronze in 2008 with his graduation film If a Body Meet a Body.

== Career ==
Davis earned a master's degree from the USC School of Cinematic Arts in 2008, his thesis film, If a Body Meet a Body, received a Student Academy Award. He is the founder of the production company, DocRiot. In 2016, he directed his first feature documentary, The Million Dollar Duck, which premiered at the Slamdance Film Festival winning both the Jury and Audience award.

== Filmography ==
Year	Title	Contribution	Note
2008	If a Body Meet a Body	Director and writer	Documentary short
2009	Prop Eight	Cinematographer	2 episodes
2011	A Path to Honor	Director	TV series
2011	You Laugh But It's True	Editor and producer	Documentary
2012	Unmade in China	Editor	Documentary
2013	Sick Mick and the Boys	Cinematographer and producer	Documentary
2013	Collecting Fragments	Director	Short film
2016	The Million Dollar Duck	Director	Documentary
2016	Stories of the Mind	Director	2 episodes
2018	Bali: Beats of Paradise	Editor	Documentary
2020	We Are the Champions	Director and producer	2 episodes

== Awards and nominations ==
Year	Result	Award	Category	Work	Ref.
2008	Won	Student Academy Awards	Documentary - Bronze Medal	If a Body Meet a Body	
2016	Won	Slamdance Film Festival	Audience Award for Documentary Feature	The Million Dollar Duck	
2016	Won	Slamdance Film Festival	Jury Award for Documentary Feature	The Million Dollar Duck	
2021	Nominated	Sports Emmy Awards	Outstanding Edited Sports Series	We Are the Champions	
