= Daniel Taylor (painter) =

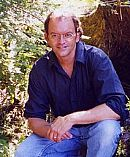
Daniel Taylor

Daniel Taylor (born February 12, 1955) is a Canadian hyperrealist painter, known for his portraits and wildlife art.

== Art ==
Taylor's art is on display in the John F. Kennedy Center for the Performing Arts in Washington, D.C.

His artwork has been featured in art publications including Wildlife Art Magazine, Western & Wildlife Art Magazine, International Artist Magazine, and Wildscape Magazine.

== Ambassadorship ==
Taylor sells reproductions of his art to raise money for wildlife conservation. He has worked with the African Conservation Foundation.

== See also ==
- List of wildlife artists
