= Birds and People =

Birds and People is a collaboration between the Random House publishing company and BirdLife International, to document the worldwide cultural significance of birds. The Birds and People project involves an open internet forum for individuals to document their reflections, experiences, and stories about birds. The project was established by naturalist and author Mark Cocker in collaboration with wildlife photographer David Tipling and science writer Jonathan Elphick.

The project is intended to create a summary of the current state of birdlife worldwide. Cocker suggests that birds are the miner's canary for the natural world. A further aim of the Birds and People project is to provide a survey of the ways in which birds enrich human lives. Loss of biodiversity is invariably considered only in terms of its ecological and environmental consequences. Birds and People is intended to highlight how a decline in species inflicts parallel losses upon the very fabric of human cultures.
