= Mark Cocker =

British author and naturalist (born 1959)

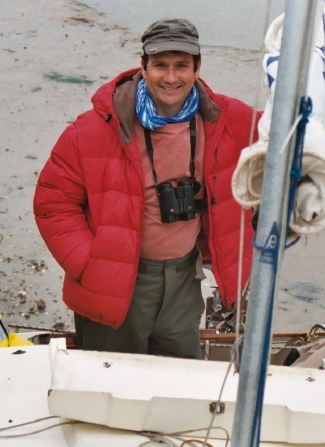
- Cocker in 2008
- Born: 1959 (age 66–67); Buxton, Derbyshire, England
- Education: Buxton College; University of East Anglia (BA, English Literature)
- Spouse: Mary Muir
- Children: 2
- Awards: Samuel Johnson Prize shortlist (2008); New Angle Prize for Literature (2009); East Anglian Book of the Year Award (2019); Fellow of the Royal Society of Literature (2025)
- Scientific career
- Fields: Naturalist; Author
- Workplaces: Royal Society for the Protection of Birds; English Nature; BirdLife International; The Guardian

Mark Cocker (born 1959) is a British author and naturalist. He lives with his wife, Mary Muir, and two daughters in Claxton, Norfolk. The countryside around Claxton is a theme for two of his twelve books.

Cocker has written extensively for British newspapers and magazines including The Guardian, The Daily Telegraph, The Times, The Independent and BBC Wildlife. He has written a regular 'Country Diary' column in the Guardian since 1988 and a wildlife column in the international subscribers' edition, the Guardian Weekly from 1996 to 2002. He reviews regularly for the Guardian and the Times Literary Supplement.

He was elected a Fellow of the Royal Society of Literature (FRSL) in 2025.

== Background and education ==
Cocker was brought up and educated in Buxton, Derbyshire, near to the Peak District National Park. This early access to the spectacular limestone flora of the Derbyshire Dales and the specialised upland birds of the Dark Peak provided formative experiences in his evolution as a naturalist.

He was educated at Buxton College, and studied English Literature at the University of East Anglia (1978–82), where he became immersed in East Anglia's nationally important wildlife landscapes, including the North Norfolk coast, Breckland and the Broads. These became the inspiration for the vast majority of 900+ articles on wildlife, published in national and regional newspapers.

An active environmentalist, Cocker worked for the RSPB (1985), English Nature (now Natural England 1985–86) and BirdLife International (1988–89). In 1998 he received a Winston Churchill Travel Fellowship to explore the cultural importance of birds in West Africa (Benin and Cameroon).

== Themes and interests ==
=== Biographical excursions ===
Cocker has travelled to over 40 countries spanning 5 continents in pursuit of wildlife. Between 1982 and 1984 he spent a total of 10 months in India and Nepal. This proved to be the background to two biographical studies: A Himalayan Ornithologist: The Life and Work of Brian Houghton Hodgson and Richard Meinertzhagen: Soldier Scientist and Spy. These examined two remarkable figures from the age of Empire, radically different in personality, but united by the polymathic range of their interests.

Hodgson was the Honourable East India Company's resident (proto Ambassador) in Nepal, where he researched zoology, from fish and amphibians, to birds and mammals. He was also a scholar of Himalayan languages and of Mahayana Buddhism. Six weeks spent in a Tibetan Buddhist monastery led to Cocker's involvement in this book.

Meinertzhagen, on the other hand, was a big-game hunter, a soldier, naturalist, minor political figure, writer, intelligence officer, explorer and diarist. Cocker's biography of Meinertzhagen received widespread critical acclaim and was judged, with Mark Hudson's Our Grandmothers' Drums and Bill Bryson's The Lost Continent, one of the highlights for Secker and Warburg in 1989. The novelist William Boyd, who had drawn on some of Meinertzhagen's writings in his novel An Ice-Cream War, said of Cocker's biographical study of Meinertzhagen:

"Mark Cocker lucidly and honestly tries to pin the man down and succeeds admirably insofar as such an attempt is possible. The problem with Meinertzhagen, … is that the chief witness and key source is the man himself. Cocker has unearthed in his diaries patent elaborations, exaggerations and falsehoods and there is evidence too that in his scientific career Meinertzhagen indulged in practices that would be considered highly fraudulent. … But with that reservation it is a compelling story and Meinertzhagen, however bizarre or preposterous or sinister or admirable we may think him, is one of the genuinely fascinating mavericks in 20th-century history."

Cocker's next two books reflected his darkening perception of Britain's wider imperial impact upon the lands and peoples that they explored and occupied.

=== Conquest and power ===
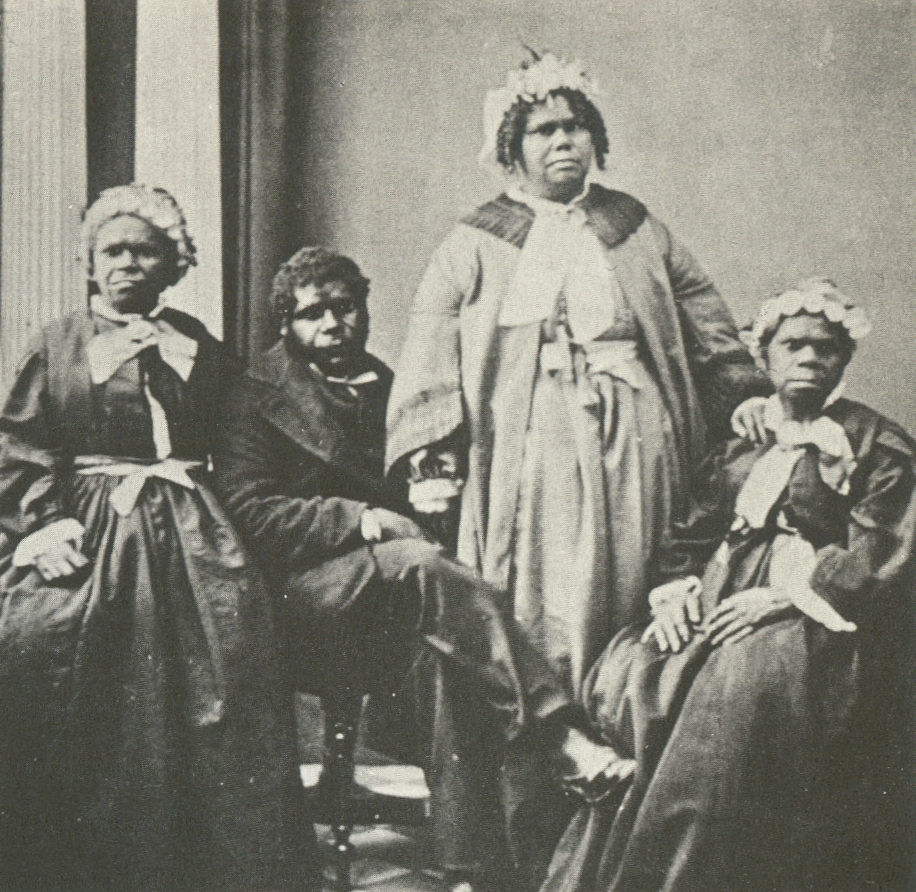
A picture of the last four "full-blooded" Tasmanian Aborigines c.1860s. Truganini, the last to survive, is seated at far right

In the 1990s, Cocker shifted his focus from the orthodox biography of colonial figures to a moral reflection upon the real impact of European Empire; this resulted in his next two books: Loneliness and Time: British Travel Writing in the Twentieth Century and Rivers of Blood, Rivers of Gold: Europe’s Conflict with Tribal People.

Loneliness and Time is an attempt to provide both a generic understanding of the importance of travel and foreign lands to the British psyche, and an investigation of the intellectual value and literary canons of the travel book. It received mixed reviews.

Loneliness and Time was followed by an indictment of European exploitation and destruction of indigenous people, Rivers of Blood, Rivers of Gold, which Cocker considered his most important book. The work focuses on four collisions between Europeans and indigenous cultures: the conquest of Mexico, the British onslaught on the Tasmanian Aborigines, the uprooting of the Apaches, and the German campaign against the tribes of Southwest Africa. The book was praised and criticised on both sides of the Atlantic for similar reasons. Among its critics, Ronald Wright, noted its "shaky existential dichotomy between Europeans and "tribal peoples"", while fellow historian Alfred Crosby suggested that "Cocker has written the kind of book we needed a generation ago, when our concept of history was profoundly Eurocentric, but surely now all of us given to reading history books are doubtful about the immaculate gloriousness of white civilization".

By contrast, Charles Nicholl wrote that "Cocker succeeds in finding a tone appropriate to the matter: he has a journalistic sense of impact and a powerful command of historical narrative. This is a powerful book, communicating its fierce indignation without recourse to polemic.", while Ronald Wright stated "The most powerful theme of Mark Cocker's books is … his vivid map of hell into which people can so easily descend when they have ideology, means and opportunity."

== "The poetry of fact" ==
All of Cocker's subsequent work has focused on aspects of natural history. The best known is the epic Birds Britannica, a work of nature study, rich with literary, historical and cultural references. It was based on Flora Britannica by nature writer Richard Mabey, who initiated its sister volume. However Mabey's ill health meant that it was written entirely by Cocker. As Philip Marsden puts it:

In the past, birds animated long journeys to market, days of trudge at trawl or plough. Their habits bred anthropomorphisms, superstitions and nicknames. These in themselves provide an extraordinary glimpse into the imaginative range of our own species. Now that we drive everywhere, now that fishermen and farmers are growing as scarce as marsh warblers, we see birds differently. Birds Britannica shows that this need not be seen as something artificial or contrived but as part of a long and ever-shifting relationship, an indicator of our own place in nature.

Cocker's work on the ubiquitous crow is in similar spirit: a rare combination of natural history and cultural anthropology. Crow Country is Cocker's most successful book to date, receiving widespread critical acclaim. Of Crow Country, Cocker said:

I would say there's a large body of writing on nature that is inaccurate, that sentimentalises nature, interpreting nature in a way that suits the writer...The facts are subjugated by the writer's feelings. But my writing is in the poetry of fact. This is not a shallow piece of study. I have found almost every paper on the subject in the English language.

The importance of being 'true' to the nature of the subject is apparent, but so too is his desire to discover the wealth of cultural significance attached to it. Like the natural detective's search for the perpetrator, Cocker's investigations are laden with significance. Reminiscent of an earlier age of scientific investigation, the 'whole picture' perspective being not unlike that of Francis Bacon who wrote in a similar vein:

Men have sought to make a world from their own conception and to draw from their own minds all the material which they employed, but if, instead of doing so, they had consulted experience and observation, they would have the facts and not opinions to reason about, and might have ultimately arrived at the knowledge of the laws which govern the natural world.

His interdisciplinary approach, combining natural science, environmentalism and cultural anthropology, is most evident in his project Birds and People.

== Birds and People ==
Cocker's latest project with foremost British wildlife photographer David Tipling and natural history author Jonathan Elphick, is Birds and People. Birds and People is a ten-year-long collaboration between the publishers Random House and BirdLife International to survey and document the worldwide cultural significance of birds. The Birds and People project involves an open internet forum, for individuals worldwide to document their reflections, experiences and stories about birds. The final book is intended as a global chorus on the relationship between human beings and birds.

The sense of freedom evoked by birds in flight has been a source of inspiration alike to tribal communities and the world's major civilisations. Writers, poets, artists and composers have drawn on the qualities of birds for thousands of years. Today birds often play the role of ambassador in our entire relationship with nature. For environmentalists they are collectively the miner's canary, their populations helping us to gauge the health of natural environments from the inner-city to the remote Arctic tundra. Yet our connections with birds far exceed any simple utilitarian value. Very often at a domestic level they are cherished for their own sake, as simple companions, as aesthetic adornments and as expression of some unspoken bond between ourselves and the rest of nature.

—

The resulting book is intended as a summary of the current state of birdlife worldwide. Cocker suggests that birds are the miner's canary for the natural world. However a further aim of the Birds and People project is to provide a panoramic survey of the multitudinous way in which birds enter and enrich human lives. This underscores the author's preoccupation with a less obvious aspect of biological impoverishment. Loss of biodiversity is invariably considered only in terms of its ecological and environmental consequences. Birds and People is intended to highlight how a decline in species inflicts parallel losses upon the very fabric of human cultures.

== Additional information ==
Cocker's book Richard Meinertzhagen was shortlisted for the Angel Award (1989). Birds Britannica, a project initiated by Richard Mabey and written by Mark Cocker, was British Birds/BTO Bird Book of the Year (2005) and described by Andrew Motion, the poet laureate as:

The great delight of my year, the book that made me feel I'd been waiting for it all my life, is the magnificently produced and completely enthralling Birds Britannica.

Crow Country was shortlisted for the Samuel Johnson Prize for Non-Fiction (2008).

Cocker is a co-founder of the Oriental Bird Club, a founding council member of the African Bird Club, a former council member of the Norfolk and Norwich Naturalists Society and President (2007–08).

Our Place was shortlisted for the Wainwright Prize (2019).

== Books ==
- with Inskipp, Carol (1988). A Himalayan Ornithologist: The Life and Work of Brian Houghton Hodgson. Oxford University Press.
- Richard Meinertzhagen Soldier, Scientist and Spy. Secker and Warburg. 1989.
- Loneliness and Time; British Travel Writing in the Twentieth Century. Secker and Warburg. 1992.
  - published as Loneliness and Time: The Story of British Travel Writing. New York: Pantheon. 1993. ISBN 9780679422426.
- Rivers of Blood, River's of Gold: Europe's Conflict with Tribal People. Jonathan Cape. 1998.
- Birders: Tales of a Tribe. Jonathan Cape. 2001.
- with Mabey, Richard (2005). Birds Britannica. Chatto and Windus.
- A Tiger in the Sand: Selected Writings on Nature. Jonathan Cape. 2006. ISBN 978-0224078825.
- Crow Country. Jonathan Cape. 2007.
- Birds and People. Jonathan Cape. 2013. ISBN 978-0224081740.
- Claxton: Field Notes from a Small Planet Paperback. Penguin Random House. 2015. ISBN 978-0099593478.
- Our Place: Can We Save Britain's Wildlife Before It Is Too Late?. Jonathan Cape. 2018. ISBN 978-0224102292.
- A Claxton Diary: Further Field Notes from a Small Planet. Jonathan Cape. 2019. ISBN 978-1787331761.
