= Brender =

Brender is a surname. Notable people with the surname include:

- Anton Brender, French economist
- Nikolaus Brender (born 1949), German journalist

== See also ==
- BRender, a development toolkit and graphics engine for computer software
- Brenders, surname
