= Hautman brothers =

American painter, residing in Minnesota

Jim Hautman, Robert Hautman, and Joseph Hautman are American painters best known for realistic wildlife art, particularly the images on the U.S. Federal Duck Stamp. They all reside in Minnesota.

Jim's paintings were on the 1990, 1995, 1999, 2011, 2016, 2022, and 2025 U.S. Federal Duck stamps. Robert's artwork was on the 1997, 2001, 2018, and 2026 stamps. Joseph, who holds a Ph.D. in physics from the University of Michigan, has had his artwork on the 1992, 2002, 2008, 2012, 2015, and 2023 stamps. Federal Duck Stamps raise millions of dollars for conservation.

== In popular culture ==
In the Coen brothers' 1996 film Fargo, Marge Gunderson's husband Norm complains about being beaten out by the Hautman's "Blue-winged Teal", which will appear on the 29-cent postage stamp, while his painting of a Mallard will only be featured on the 3-cent stamp. In real life, the stamp is not for postage. The Coen Brothers, who are fellow Minnesotans, knew the Hautman brothers personally.

The Hautmans were featured in the 2016 documentary The Million Dollar Duck about the contest.

== See also ==
- Bonnie, Rebecca and Karen Latham
