= African Conservation Foundation =

International non-governmental organisation

- Founded: 2001 (First activities in 1999)
- Founder: Terry Harnwell, John Parkin, Arend de Haas
- Type: Charity
- Purpose: Wildlife Conservation
- Location: United Kingdom, Kenya, Cameroon
- Region served: African continent
- Method: field projects, research, consultancy
- Website: africanconservation.org

The African Conservation Foundation (ACF) is an international non-governmental organisation established in 1999 and registered in 2001. Its focus is wildlife and habitat conservation within and outside of protected areas, adopting an integrated approach which includes community development and environmental education. The organisation is registered as a charity, supporting and conducting field conservation projects around Africa. It also maintains an Africa-wide network for information exchange and capacity building of conservation efforts in the region.

== Mission ==
The organisation's mission is "to change the approach of the management and utilization of natural resources to one in which the needs of human development in the region are reconciled with biodiversity conservation".

== Conservation approach ==
ACF works together with a large number of different partners to achieve its mission, including other NGOs, governmental organisations, companies, researchers and local communities. It conducts field projects in close collaboration with local partners, building in-country capacity by providing technical and fundraising support. The organisation is involved in wildlife conservation, great apes conservation (Cross River gorilla, Nigeria-Cameroon chimpanzee), habitat and tropical forest conservation. It is also running tree planting and reforestation programmes in Kenya and Cameroon, and is a World Elephant Day associate.

== Education ==
Through its website, the organisation provides conservation news and action alerts, information about jobs and volunteer opportunities, and seeks to educate people on conservation issues in Africa. ACF involves volunteers in various aspects of its work, online and in the field.

== Campaigns ==
- Save the Cross River Gorillas

== Wildlife art ==
The African Conservation Foundation is working closely together with Canadian Artist Daniel Taylor on a project called ArtSavingWildlife which aims to raise awareness and funds for the conservation of Africa's most endangered species.
