= David Tipling =

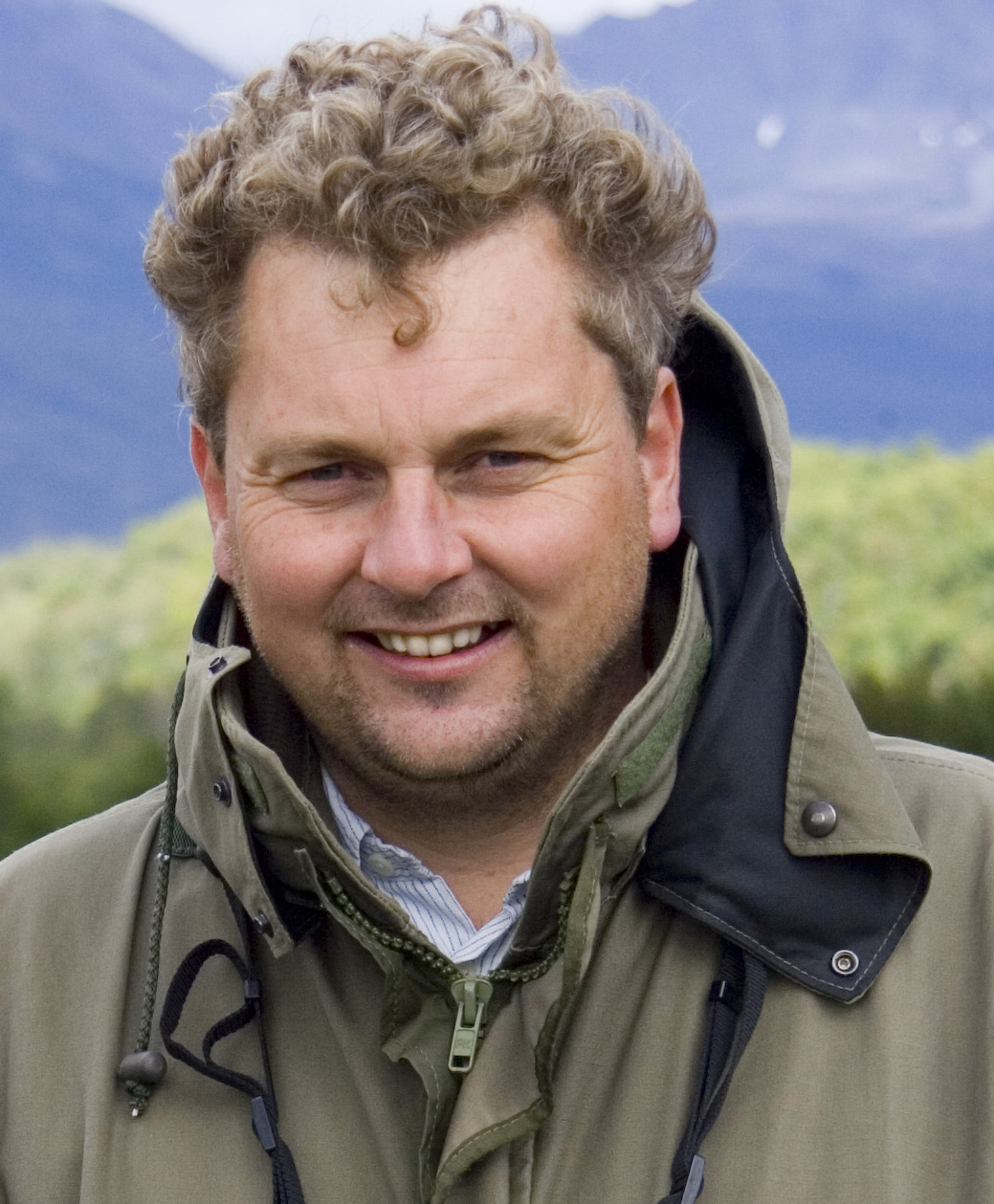
- David Tipling
- Born: Hove, Sussex
- Awards: European Nature Photographer of the Year (2001)
- Scientific career
- Fields: Ornithology; Nature Photography
- Workplaces: Freelance

David Tipling is a professional wildlife photographer. He has won the documentary award for the European Nature Photographer of the Year for his work on emperor penguins.

He is the author or commissioned photographer for more than 30 books that include Collins Top Birding Spots in Britain & Ireland, The National Parks and Other Wild Places of Britain & Ireland, Attracting Wildlife to your Garden, and most recently The RSPB Guide to Digital Wildlife Photography.

== Background and education ==
Born in Hove Sussex, David Tipling was educated at the Wildernesse School in Sevenoaks. A keen birdwatcher from an early age, his parents bought him his first camera in his teens. Tipling was soon recording the birds in his local area.

A largely self-taught wildlife photographer, Tipling came under the watchful eye of Roy Coles, the then warden of nearby Bough Beech Reservoir, a nature reserve in Kent. Tipling learned his craft largely by 'trial and error' and by training his eye, studying the work of various artist's who gave him his distinctive 'artistic' sense of composition.

Between 1983 and 1994, he travelled throughout Britain following birdwatchers to photograph the rarities they were traveling to see. This gave him a grounding in fieldcraft and ornithology.

== Themes and interests ==
Tipling's photography is influenced by the Swedish painter Bruno Liljefors, whose often brooding depictions of predator-prey action – such as the hunts engaged between sea eagle and eider, goshawk and black grouse – help to create their darkly primitive atmosphere.

Tipling cites Oriental ink painting, which has its roots in calligraphy, as being an influence on his photography.

In 1994, Tipling wrote an article on bird conservation in New Scientist about the declining state of the barn owl:

Once a familiar bird to every country dweller, pesticides, destruction of habitat, fluctuation in climate and a decline in available prey have all contributed to its decline. Barn owl populations do rise and fall in cycle with vole populations and, being largely nocturnal, there may also be appreciable numbers going unrecorded. However, the population appears to have fallen by 43 per cent since the first atlas, and a similar decline has been reported in many other European countries.

— David Tipling

== Published work ==
Tipling's work has been published in magazines such as British Birds, Birds Illustrated, Birdwatch, Dutch Birding and Birding World; as well as being used in national newspapers.

Tipling's has also worked with the ornithologist Jonathan Elphick, together they published GREAT BIRDS: 200 Star Species of Britain.

Tipling is a photographic consultant for British Birds. From 1994 to 2003, he had a monthly quizbird column in Bird Watching Magazine. Picture credits include over 500 book covers for example Pecked to Death by Ducks by Tim Cahill, various Lonely Planet guides including Antarctica and the Secret Life of Birds by Dominic Couzens.

Books completely illustrated by Tipling include Collins Gem Guide to Garden Birds, Understanding Bird Behaviour by Stephen Moss, Bird Identification and Fieldcraft by Mark Ward.

Tipling has also undertaken major advertising work, for clients including Pedigree Chum and Fuji Film, who ran an advertising campaign using his emperor penguins from 2001 to 2003. Tipling's emperor penguins were also used in the Walmart ad campaign in the United States in 2002.

== Birds and People ==
Tipling's latest project with author and naturalist Mark Cocker and natural history researcher Jonathan Elphick, is Birds and People. Birds and People is a ten-year-long collaboration between the publishers Random House and BirdLife International, to survey and document worldwide, the cultural significance of birds,

Tipling's role within the Birds and People project, as photographer and editor, is both to photograph and find images that illustrate the connection between man and bird as depicted in the stories recorded and covered by the project.

Images will range from depictions of the birds themselves to pieces of art, objects such as ceramics, architecture, and of course people. The Birds and People project involves an open internet forum, for individuals worldwide to document their reflections, experiences and stories about birds.

== Gallery ==
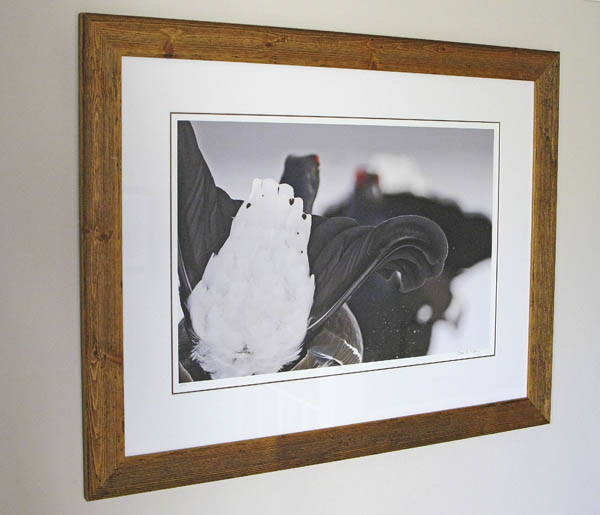
Black Grouse, framed print.

== Critical reception ==
Sir David Bellamy described Tipling's photographs in The National Parks and other Wild Places of Britain and Ireland as "windows of wonder".

== Bibliography ==
- Owls (with Jari Peltomäki), Evans Mitchell Books, 2013
- Digital Wildlife Photography, Publisher Firefly Books, 2007
- The Birdwatcher's Guide to Digital Photography, Thunder Bay Press (CA), 2006
- Collins Top Birding Spots in Britain & Ireland, Tipling D., Collins, 1996
- The National Parks and Other Wild Places of Britain & Ireland, New Holland Publishers, 2003.
- The RSPB Guide to Digital Wildlife Photography
- Attracting Wildlife to your Garden
- Bird Photography: Choosing the Best Destinations-Planning a Trip-Taking Great Photographs, Photographers' Institute Press, 2005.
- Seabirds of the World (Photographic Handbooks) by Jim Enticott and David Tipling, Stackpole Books; 1st ed edition, 1997.
