= Eric Jablonowski =

American painter

Eric Jablonowski is an American painter, Pennsylvania native, that currently resides in Georgia. The artist is best known for his realism wildlife art and fine art landscapes. The artist's paintings are featured on the 2018 Delaware Trout Stamp. and the Pacific Salmon Foundation’s 2022-2023 Salmon Conservation Stamp.
