= Jackson Miles Abbott =

American painter

- Born: January 25, 1920; Philadelphia, Pennsylvania, U.S.
- Died: May 3, 1988 (aged 68); Fairfax, Virginia, U.S.
- Occupations: United States Army officer Birdwatcher; Painter

Jackson Miles Abbott (January 25, 1920 – May 3, 1988) was an American Lieutenant Colonel in the United States Army Corps of Engineers, a birdwatcher and painter. He was the son of wildlife artist Jacob Bates Abbott. He is the only artist to ever place both first and second in the same year in the Federal Duck Stamp contest. The Jackson Miles Abbott Wetland Refuge at Fort Belvoir in Fairfax County, Virginia, was named in his honor.

== Early life and military service ==
Jackson Miles Abbott was born in Philadelphia, Pennsylvania in 1920. He was the son of wildlife painter Jacob Bates Abbott. As a youth, Abbott lived in New England and southern California. He came into birdwatching when he was six years old. He attended Swarthmore College for zoology. In 1941 he joined the United States Army and in 1942 he was stationed in the Caribbean. For two years he designed and engineered camouflage for the Army. He graduated from the Officer Candidate School in August, 1943. During World War II he earned a Bronze Star Medal. Post-war, he became an intelligence officer and a field manual writer. In 1949 he became a Technical Intelligence Specialist for the Army Map Service, working in Korea. In the United States Army Corps of Engineers he rose to the rank of lieutenant colonel.

== Birding and environmentalism ==
Upon joining the Army in 1941, Abbott started the Annual Christmas Bird Count at Fort Belvoir. The count has taken place yearly, as part of the Audubon Society. He lived and worked in Alexandria, Virginia, where he studied birds living on the Potomac River and the surrounding area. He focused on the American bald eagle in the upper Chesapeake Bay. With the bald eagle, he studied their nest eggs. After observations, if an egg didn't eventually hatch, the egg would be taken to a laboratory and tested for DDT exposure.

He bird ringed 1,400 birds during a seven-month period as part of a migration study by the United States Fish and Wildlife Service. In the early 1960s he produced a "bird hazard survey" at Reagan National Airport for the Civil Aeronautics Administration. Abbott also led land conservation efforts in the areas of northern Virginia. He helped conserve Huntley Meadows Park and Dyke Marsh. He also fought against the spreading of the hydrilla plant in Potomac watershed.

As a writer on the subject of birds, he wrote a weekly column on birds for The Washington Star and published works about the birds of Fort Belvoir, bird attraction and the birds of Trinidad and Tobago.

== Art ==
Abbott learned to draw from his father. In 1951 he began publishing his artwork. He won the Federal Duck Stamp award in 1957–59 for his painting of common eider. That same year, he also came in second, for his painting of the pale-bellied brant goose. He is the only person to ever place first and second in the duck stamp contest. The common eider stamp was released on July 1, 1957, sold for $2 and sold over 2.35 million copies. In total, he created over 1,500 works in his lifetime.

== Death and legacy ==
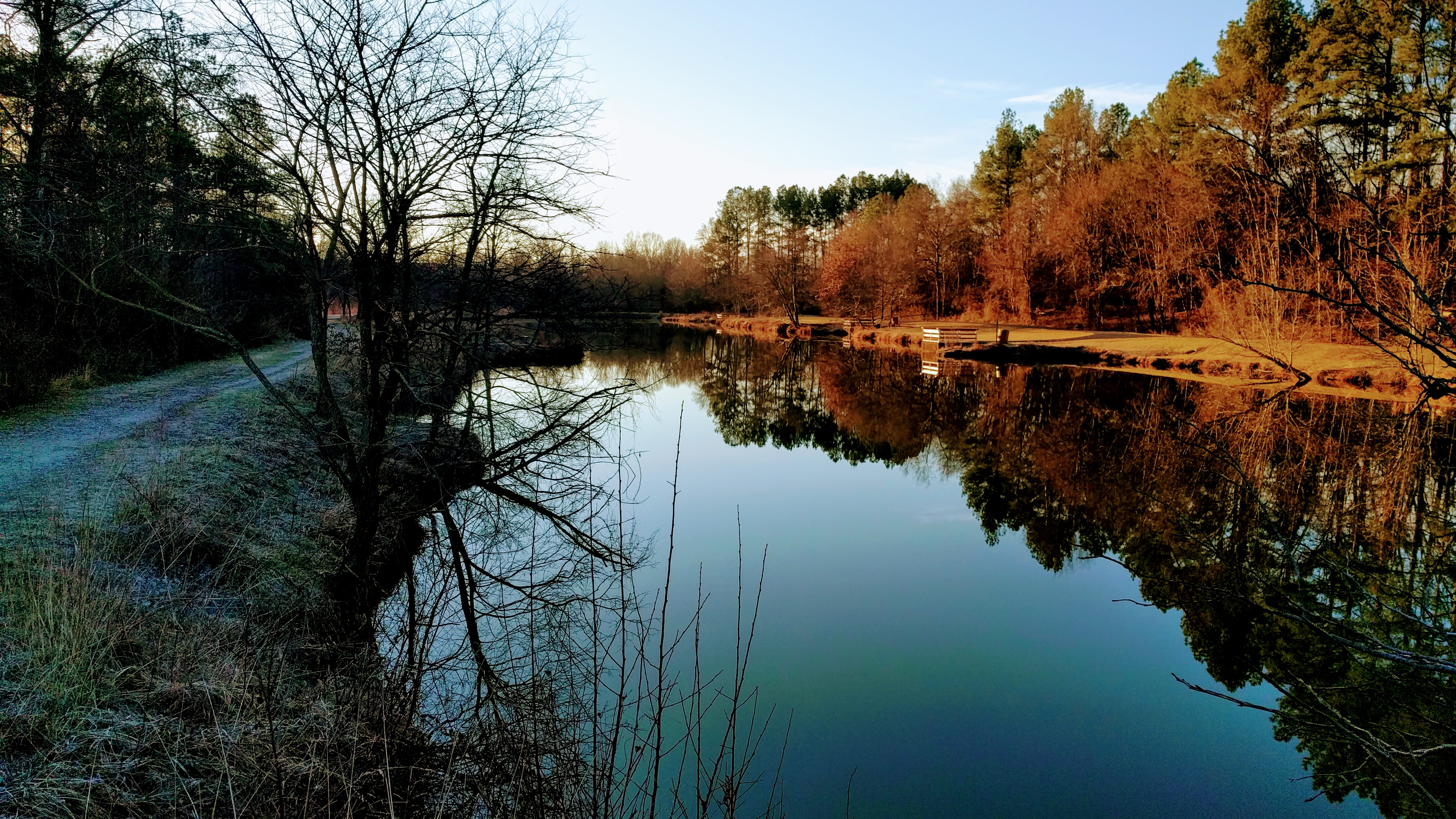
Jackson M. Abbott Wetland Refuge

He died on May 3, 1988, of cancer in Fairfax, Virginia. He was buried at Arlington National Cemetery. In 1989, the United States Army Corps of Engineers founded and named the Jackson Miles Abbott Wetland Refuge at Fort Belvoir after him. The refuge is a 150-acre tract. His archives reside in the Smithsonian Institution Archives.
