= Robert Gilmour (journalist) =

Robert Gilmour (24 October 1831 – 24 April 1902) was a New Zealand farmer, journalist, newspaper proprietor and editor. He was born in Glasgow, Lanarkshire, Scotland on 24 October 1831.
