= Karen Latham =

American painter

- Known for: Painting wildlife miniatures and portraits
- Movement: Realism movement
- Spouse: Ken Latham
- Awards: 2004 Award of Excellence for In the Light at a Society of Animal Artists; 2008 Illinois Conservation Stamp
- Website: www.lathamstudios.com

Karen Latham is an American painter, residing in Hastings, Minnesota. Latham is most known for her realistic miniature paintings of wildlife. Latham is the mother of Bonnie and Rebecca Latham, also painters in the same style.

== Biography ==
Karen Latham began painting portraits at the age of 10. As a child she painted with watercolors and acrylics. She has owned the Nature's Palette Gallery in Hastings, Minnesota, where she has held art classes. She is married to Ken Latham, a chemical engineer at 3M. Latham homeschooled her artistic daughters, Bonnie, and Rebecca, who also live in Hastings.

Latham paints wildlife, using acrylics, in naturalist, realist, representationism and realism styles. She also makes portraits. Latham and her daughter, Rebecca, illustrated the V is for Viking (2003) children's book, and their work was included in the P is for Passport (2003) book. Karen won an Award of Excellence for In the Light at a Society of Animal Artists exhibition in 2004. Latham was an award winner at the national 2004 and 2005 Arts for the Parks contests. One of Karen's paintings was selected for the 2008 Illinois Conservation Stamp.

== Latham women ==
Latham exhibits with her daughters, all of whom make realist paintings of wildlife in miniature. The girls started to paint in earnest about the age of 12 and their works were shown in the family's art gallery, by or before 2000.

Bonnie's painting of a pintail duck was selected for the 2000 Federal Junior duck stamp, (Note: Bonnie is the second girl to win the contest since it began in 1993. Rebecca finished 10th in the adult Federal Duck Stamp competition in 1999 and 2nd in 1998.) (Note: Having won second place nationally ("Best of Show" in Minnesota) for her pair of Redheads, Rebecca Latham and her parents, Ted and Karen Latham, won a free trip to Washington, D.C. While there, they will be able to see the adult Federal Duck Stamp contest judging.) The winning stamp was sold for $5 as a collectible stamp. Rebecca's paintings have been selected for the 2009 Illinois Conservation Stamp and 2003 Minnesota Turkey Stamp.

The Latham women's paintings have been shown in the Smithsonian, Nature in Art museum (UK), Hiram Blauvelt museum, and the Gilcrease Museum. In 2007, all three exhibited their work at Seaside Art Gallery in Nags Head, North Carolina for the 16th International Miniature Art Show. Their artwork has been featured in numerous art publications including Wildlife Art magazine and Wildscape Magazine. All three women have each been named "artist of the year" by conservation organizations, are members of many art and wildlife societies, and are signature members of the Society of Animal Artists, which means that they participated in 15 or more annual exhibitions.
