= The Conservation Foundation (Illinois) =

US non-profit organization

- Predecessor: Forest Foundation of DuPage County
- Formation: 1972; 54 years ago
- Type: Non-governmental organization
- Tax ID no.: 23-7221206
- Legal status: 501(c)(3)
- Purpose: conservation, environmental education, sustainability
- Headquarters: Naperville, Illinois
- Region served: Northern Illinois, US
- Website: theconservationfoundation.org

The Conservation Foundation is a non-governmental, not-for-profit 501(c)(3) organization with a mission to preserve open space and natural lands, protect rivers and watersheds, and promote stewardship of the environment.

It serves northern Illinois counties of DuPage, Kane, Kendall and Will.

== McDonald Farm ==
In 1992, Lenore Clow McDonald donated her 60-acre farm to The Conservation Foundation, subject to conservation easement. The farm now serves as headquarters for the organization.

Located on the farm is a partner organization, The Resiliency Institute, which uses permaculture education and design to foster resilient lifestyles, landscapes and communities.

== Green Earth Harvest ==
A major program at the Foundation is Green Earth Harvest. This is a certified organic farm that provides local, organic vegetables through environmentally sustainable methods.
