= Robert Gilmour (footballer) =

Scottish footballer

Personal information
- Place of birth: Scotland
- Position: Inside forward

Senior career*
Years	Team	Apps	(Gls)
1909–1913	Queen's Park	14	(2)
1910	→ Falkirk (loan)	1	(0)
- * Club domestic league appearances and goals

H. Robert Gilmour was a Scottish amateur football inside forward who played in the Scottish League for Queen's Park and Falkirk.

== Personal life ==
Gilmour served as a second lieutenant in the Royal Garrison Artillery during the First World War.

== Career statistics ==
Club	Season	League			Scottish Cup		Total	
Club	Season	Division	Apps	Goals	Apps	Goals	Apps	Goals
Queen's Park	1909–10	Scottish First Division	11	1	3	0	14	1
Queen's Park	1910–11	Scottish First Division	3	1	0	0	3	1
Queen's Park	Total		14	2	3	0	17	2
Falkirk	1910–11	Scottish First Division	1	0	0	0	1	0
Career total			15	2	3	0	18	2
