= Alan Hunt (English cricketer) =

English cricketer (born 1968)

Alan Hunt (born 28 December 1968) was an English cricketer. He was a right-handed batsman who played for Gloucestershire. He was born in Birmingham.

Hunt, who also played for Worcestershire and Gloucestershire Second XIs, made a single first-class appearance for the team, during the 1991 season, against the touring Sri Lankans. He scored 3 runs in the first innings in which he batted, and 12 runs in the second.
