= Jacob Bates Abbott =

American wildlife artist and illustrator (1895–1950)

- Born: November 11, 1895; Brookline, Massachusetts
- Died: July 14/15, 1950 (aged 54); Brattleboro, Vermont
- Education: Harvard University
- Known for: Wildlife painting and drawing; Bird illustration
- Children: Jackson Miles Abbott, Jaclyn Ruth Abbott

Signature
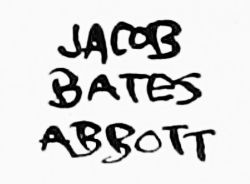

Jacob Bates Abbott (November 11, 1895 – July 14/15, 1950) was an American wildlife artist and illustrator, birder, and conservationist. Born in Brookline, Massachusetts, Abbott served as a second lieutenant in the US Army during First World War before establishing himself as a prolific artist and illustrator for ornithological field guides, magazines, and books. He was an Associate of the American Ornithologists' Union and was described by Arlie W. Schorger as one of America's "foremost wildlife artists."

== Early career and military service ==
From 1914 to 1916, Abbott attended Harvard University, where he was an editor and illustrator at the Harvard Lampoon.

In May 1917, he entered the Army's Officer's Training Camp at Fort Niagara and was commissioned as a second lieutenant in August of that year. He was deployed in France in 1918 as a machine gun officer with the 112th Infantry and fought at the Battle of Château-Thierry. Toward the end of the battle (on July 17) he was the victim of a chemical attack, following which he spent five months in a hospital; he was discharged from the Army in January 1919.

After leaving the Army, Abbott worked for a time as a bond broker, while illustrating on the side. He moved to California in 1929, where he worked as a cartoonist, illustrating a comic strip called The Gay Stone Age.

== Artistic career ==
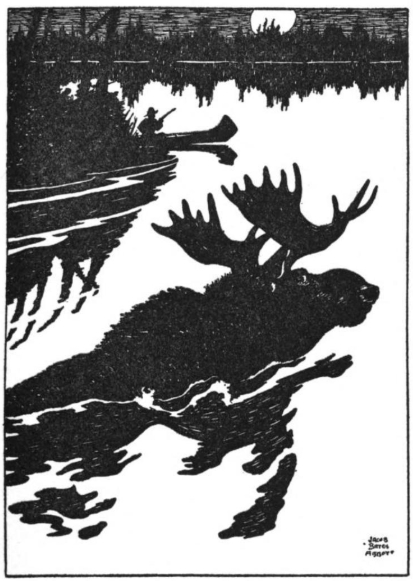
Early illustration for Katahdin Camps by C.A. Stephens, 1928

From the mid-1930s until his death in 1950, Abbott dedicated his artistic efforts almost exclusively to wildlife painting and illustration. In that time, he illustrated several ornithological field guides and created works for magazines and other publications, including children's books. One of his works was requested for a collection of wildlife paintings by the Library of Congress during his lifetime.

=== Magazines ===
In the early 1930s, Abbott moved back to New England, where he became the art director of Yankee Magazine in Dublin, New Hampshire. Two of his nature paintings were later featured as covers of The Saturday Evening Post (March 23, 1935 and June 10, 1939). He also painted a cover for National Sportsman (November 1937) and a map of American state birds, trees, and flowers for Look Magazine.

From 1941 to 1949, Abbott worked closely with Pennsylvania Game News, a publication of the Pennsylvania Game Commission, for whom he painted cover art and drew many illustrations. He also created bird-identification posters that are reproduced in the pamphlet Pennsylvania Birdlife. During this time he lived in Haverford, Pennsylvania.

=== Field guides and bird books ===
Abbott illustrated several ornithological field guides and a bird encyclopedia written by Leon Augustus Hausman, a professor of Zoology at Rutgers University's New Jersey College for Women: in particular, he illustrated the Field Book of Eastern Birds and Birds of Prey of Northeastern North America, and he produced over 700 illustrations for The Illustrated Encyclopedia of American Birds. American ornithologists Herbert Friedmann and Josselyn Van Tyne had generally positive reviews of his illustrations for the 1946 Field Book.

Abbott also illustrated the children's book Birds at Home by Marguerite Henry. A reviewer of the book in The Quarterly Review of Biology wrote that his twelve full-color plates "would make a worthy addition to any bird lover's library."

=== Other art and collections ===
Abbott illustrated many books and other publications throughout his career. Three non-wildlife etchings by Abbott are currently held in the Princeton University Art Museum.

A folder on Abbott is kept at the Smithsonian Institution, and his papers are housed in the University of Pittsburgh Library's Archives and Special Collections.

== Birding, writing, and conservationism ==
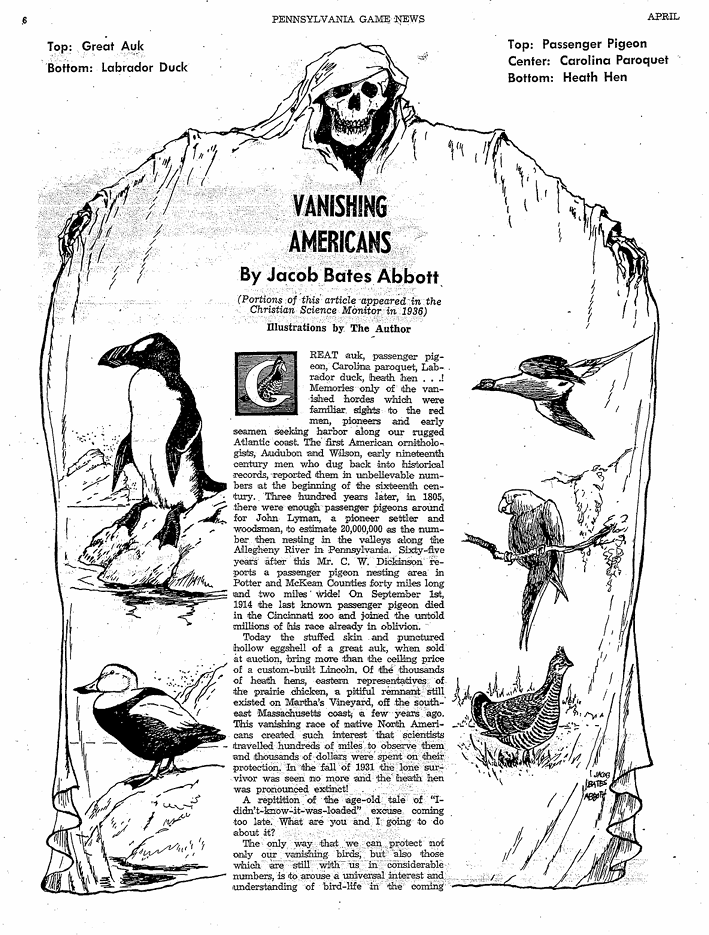
First page of "Vanishing Americans." Pennsylvania Game News, April 1946.

Abbott's lifelong interest in birds and birdwatching is evidenced by his membership in an Audubon society as early as 1920. Later in life, he became an Associate of the American Ornithologists' Union; and at different times he was also a member of the Cooper Ornithological Society, the American Museum of Natural History, and the Delaware Valley Ornithological Club. His papers show that he was committed to the careful observation of wildlife, taking down extensive field notes and making field drawings on trips across California, New Hampshire, Pennsylvania, and elsewhere. In an essay written for The Awk (the journal of the American Ornithological Society), he details one such birding trip that he took with his son, Jackson Miles Abbott, in which they observed the nest of an American Goshawk (then called "Eastern Goshawk") in southern New Hampshire.

Abbott frequently wrote (and illustrated) articles in Pennsylvania Game News about birding and conservation. For example, one of his articles, "Vanishing Americans," begins by describing different extinct species of bird before advocating for the protection of several then-endangered species of avian and non-avian wildlife. Among these, he focuses especially on the California Condor, the Ivory-billed Woodpecker, the Trumpeter Swan, and the Whooping Crane. Toward the beginning of the essay, Abbott sums up his position as a conservationist, writing of how "[t]he only way that we can protect not only our vanishing birds, but also those which are still with us in considerable numbers, is to arouse a universal interest and understanding of bird-life in the coming generation of citizens."

== Family and personal life ==
In 1917, Jacob married Eleanor Ruth Jackson, with whom he had two children: Jackson Miles Abbott and Jaclyn Ruth Abbott. His son Jackson shared a love of birds and art, and he went on to become a well-known painter and environmentalist in his own right—in addition to reaching the rank of lieutenant colonel in the United States Army Corps of Engineers. Jackson Miles Abbott won the Federal Duck Stamp Contest for 1957–58 with his painting of a pair of Common Eider (then called "American Eider"), and Jackson Miles Abbott Wetland Refuge at Fort Belvoir is named after him.

Jacob Bates Abbott died of a heart attack in an antique shop in Brattleboro, Vermont on July 14/15, 1950 (sources vary as to the exact date).
