= Jonathan Elphick =

British natural history writer

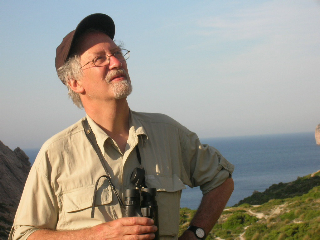
- In Boquer Valley, Majorca, May 2007
- Born: 1945 (age 80–81); Prestatyn, Flintshire, Wales, UK
- Education: University of Swansea (Zoology)
- Spouse: Melanie Willcock
- Scientific career
- Fields: Ornithology; Art; Natural History; Author
- Workplaces: Freelance

Jonathan Elphick is a British natural history writer, editor and consultant. He is an eminent ornithologist, a qualified zoologist; Fellow of the Zoological Society of London and a Fellow of the Linnean Society of London. He is author of The Birdwatcher's Handbook: A Guide to the Birds of Britain and Ireland; Birds: The Art of Ornithology and The Natural History Museum Atlas of Bird Migration: Tracing the Great Journeys of the World's Birds, which received Bird Watching Magazine's 'Best Bird Reference Book of the Year'; as well as co-author of the Encyclopedia of Animals; the RSPB Pocket Birds; A Unique Photographic Guide to the Birds of Britain and Europe with Jonathan Woodward and The National Parks and other Wild Places of Britain and Ireland, with photography by David Tipling.

He has also been consultant, editor or author on a variety of other books, articles and CD-ROMs including Coastline with Greenpeace, and the BBC production of The Realms of the Russian Bear.

== Background and education ==
Born in 1945, in Prestatyn, in what was then the historic county of Flintshire (Welsh: Sir y Fflint) until re-organisation made it part of Clwyd and then Denbighshire; Jonathan Elphick was raised in North Wales, surrounded by a mountainous and beautiful mosaic of habitats: including traditional mixed farmland, woods, rivers, lakes, hills and coastlines. He spent the first four years of his life in Rhyl, then moved to Dyserth, where he attended Ysgol Hiraddug, Dyserth, moving on to St Asaph's Grammar School and ultimately University College, Swansea (1964–1968), one of the four colleges comprising the University of Wales.

Birdlife in North Wales in the early 1950s was relatively unaffected by agricultural developments and other changes, that proved to be major factors in the decline of many British birds.

Inspired by, among others, the writings of Bruce Campbell one of the foremost ornithologists of the day, Elphick's journey through ornithological literature began with the paperback Bird Watching for Beginners and Campbell's Birds in Colour. Migrating from the Bird Recognition paperback guides (by the ornithologist James Fisher) he came under the influence of the Nature Conservancy warden at Newborough Warren National Nature Reserve, on the Isle of Anglesey, Peter Hope-Jones. In 1969 Elphick gained a BSc. degree in Zoology and secured a job as a Natural history editor, working as an in-house editor for various publishers including Dorling Kindersley, eventually going freelance and specialising in Birds.

== Themes and interests ==
Elphick worked for five years as researcher on the best-selling book Birds Britannica, written by Mark Cocker. He specialises in the cultural history of birds and our changing attitudes to them. His work encompasses a variety of aspects that interest him, including practical field ornithology, biological research, the history of natural history, as well as ornithological art, all of which inform his personal reaction to birds. Elphick is a keen conservationist who has travelled extensively to both study and make people aware of the importance of the Conservation movement at home and abroad.

=== Art and ornithology ===
The Natural History Museum in London is the repository for some half a million works on paper and one million books, which are the sources for some exceptionally beautiful and important images of birds. Many are from rare sources. Elphick's work is a selection of art works from this archive, including the work of artists such as John James Audubon, along with Victorian explorers, who catalogued the world's avifauna before the age of photography. It documents the work of many natural history artists, such as John Gould, William MacGillivray and Ferdinand Bauer. The text interweaves ornithological science, art history, biography, travel and other aspects of the subject to paint a picture of the artists and the birds they painted.

== Great Birds ==
Great Birds: 200 Star Species of Britain, undertaken with the photographer David Tipling, was published in 2006.

=== Birds and People ===
Elphick is part of a team of naturalists and authors, including the British wildlife photographer David Tipling and the naturalist and author Mark Cocker, undertaking the Birds and People project. Birds and People is a ten-year-long, groundbreaking collaboration between the publishers Random House and BirdLife International, to survey and document worldwide, the cultural significance of birds. The Birds and People project involves an open internet forum, for individuals worldwide to document their reflections, experiences and stories about bird. The final book is intended as a global chorus on the relationship between human beings and birds.
