= We Are the Champions (American TV series) =

- Genre: Reality-TV
- Directed by: Brian Golden Davis; Nick Frew; Martin Desmond Roe
- Country of origin: United States
- Original language: English
- No. of seasons: 1
- No. of episodes: 6

Production
- Running time: 29–35 minutes

Original release
- Network: Netflix
- Release: November 17, 2020

We Are the Champions is a 2020 American television series about unique competitions and the people competing in them. Rainn Wilson provides narration.
