= Society of Wildlife Artists =

British organisation for artists who paint or draw wildlife

The Society of Wildlife Artists (SWLA) is a British organisation for artists who paint or draw wildlife. It was founded in 1964. Its founder president was Sir Peter Scott, the current president of the society is British artist Harriet Mead.

The society was founded by Eric Ennion and Robert Gillmor. Other founder members were Donald Watson, a former president of the Scottish Ornithologists' Club artist James T.A. Osborne a Fellow of the Royal Society of Painter-Etchers, and artist Eileen Soper.

The society holds an annual exhibition at the Federation of British Artists in the Mall Galleries, every September/ October.

The society is a registered charity in England and Wales, number 328717.

== See also ==
- Federation of British Artists
- Wildlife art
- List of wildlife artists
