= Władysław Siwek =

Polish artist (1907–1983)

Władysław Siwek (1 April 1907 - 27 March 1983) was a Polish artist who is known for his depictions of the Auschwitz concentration camp where he was held during the Nazi occupation of Poland. After the war, he was the director of Auschwitz-Birkenau Memorial and Museum, and then worked as an illustrator for books on plants and animals.

Siwek studied at the public school in Niepołomice and the Gymnasium at Kraków. From 1929 to 1939 Siwek worked with in the District Directorate of State Railways in Kraków while also studying at the Academy of Fine Arts in Kraków.

On January 14, 1940 he was arrested in Niepołomice, placed in Montelupich Prison and on October 8 he was sent to the Auschwitz Concentration Camp (prisoner number 5826). He painted signboards at the camp including warning signs and after he painted a portrait of an SS officer, he began to receive orders from other German officers for portraits and landscapes. He privately made portraits of more than 2000 of his fellow prisoners. On October 29, 1944, Siwek was moved to Sachsenhausen where the Polish elite were held. Here he continued art work after his work hours at an aircraft factory. As the Allies progressed, 30000 prisoners including Siwek were made to march to camps further away. More than 7000 prisoners died of starvation and those that were unable to keep up were shot dead. Siwek was liberated by Allied forces on 3 May 1945 from the German town of Scherin.

After the war, Siwek produced paintings of life in the concentration camps, several of which are on display in Auschwitz Museum in block no. 6. He was employed by the museum at Auschwitz (Oświęcim) from 1948 to 1953, first as a head of education department (1949-1952), and then as director (1952-1953). He subsequently worked as illustrator for "Nasza Księgarnia" publishing house, where he contributed to numerous books with his drawing of animals and plants, including those by Włodzimierz Puchalski ("In the Land of Swans" (1956), "Cormorant Island" (1957)), Władysław Szafer ("Protected Plants in Poland" (1958). He also illustrated "Birds of Poland", 1965, "Reptiles", 1969, "Birds of Europe", 1982 and the Great Encyclopedia.
