= Alan M. Hunt =

British artist

Alan M. Hunt is a British wildlife artist. Born in Redcar, in the northeast of England, he has been painting for nearly 60 years and is best known for his photorealism style and paintings of endangered animals.

Hunt spent much of his career on field trips to enable him to study animals in their natural environments. Much of Hunt's artwork reflects the wildlife he observed around the world. He has photographed much of his reference material during his time in Africa, including safari in Kruger National Park in South Africa, Masai Mara National Reserve in Kenya, the Okavango Delta in Botswana, and the Serengeti in Tanzania. He was invited to join a team of artists in residence as lead painters on a Sea Safari around the Antarctic Peninsula. Hunt has additionally travelled to Alaska and Yellowstone National Park in the US, and Guatemala, India, Nepal, and Madagascar.

Hunt has been a featured artist in several books and exhibitions, is often cited as a source of inspiration by other artists

In addition to supporting conservation activities, in 2017 Hunt donated a selection of original artwork and limited edition prints to the Mayor of Redcar and Cleveland to be sold for charity.

== Education and early years ==
Alan M Hunt was born on 15 June 1947 in North Yorkshire, United Kingdom.

He studied art at Cleveland College of Art and Design (then Middlesbrough School of Art), and went on to study Zoology at Leeds City College and the University of Bristol.

The first exhibition of his work was held in Hunt's home town of Redcar, North Yorkshire, at the age of 18. Since then, Hunt's original paintings have been exhibited internationally.

== Awards and honours ==
Hunt is the recipient of numerous accolades as a wildlife painter, and has won several national and international awards for his work.

The Society of Animal Artists (USA):

- 1996 - Northern Majesty
- 1989 - Gone But Not Forgotten
- 1987 - A Gathering of Swallows
- 1986 - Snow Leopard

The Society of Wildlife Art (SWLA, UK) Best Artist on Show for three consecutive years.

Hunt was section winner in the Animals in their Environment section in the BBC Wildlife Artist of the Year 2010 with his Tiger Painting Watchmen, and was Endangered Species runner up for Tiger in Water.

Hunt judged the Daily Mail Not the Turner Prize painting competition, an alternative competition and the National Children's Art Competition, both at the Mall Galleries in London.

Hunt has been the lead artist at five exhibitions in the US and in 1998, was the first non-American painter to be voted into the American Wildlife Art Hall of Fame. In 1999, he was chosen as Artist of the Year for the Florida Wildlife Art Expo.

Hunt's paintings have been sold at international auction houses:

- Christie's
- Sotheby's
- Phillips
- Bonham's UK & Singapore

== Personal life ==
Hunt lives in North Yorkshire, UK with his partner, British equestrian artist Judi Kent Pyrah.

== Artistic style and influences ==
Some of the more recent paintings by Hunt diverge from his traditional subjects. Through experimentation, Hunt has developed his style to realistically capture fabrics such as satin and silk alongside the fur and feathers of his usual subject matter.

Hunt's work has been shown alongside most of the world's most esteemed wildlife artists, including David Shepherd.

Hunt's work was the subject of the book On The Edge in 2006.

== Wildlife conservation ==
Hunt is motivated by conservation and this passion has driven many fundraising efforts during his lifetime, raising money through donated artwork and percentage donations from print royalties for numerous foundations and trusts.

As a shortlisted artist for the David Shepherd Wildlife Artist of the Year (2018) competition, Hunt's work helps raise awareness and 50% of each sale supports the fight against wildlife crime and protect endangered species.

Hunt regularly exhibited at the National Exhibition of Wildlife Art (NEWA). Conservation was one of its underlying concerns and a donation from the exhibition was made each year to wildlife causes.
