= Eric Ennion =

British painter (1900–1981)

- Born: Eric Arnold Roberts Ennion; 1900
- Died: 1981 (aged 80–81)
- Education: Caius College, Cambridge
- Occupations: Doctor; Author; Artist; Conservationist
- Children: Hugh Ennion (artist)

Eric Arnold Roberts Ennion (1900–1981) was a British artist, writer, illustrator, and radio presenter, specialising in birds and other natural history subjects.

Following education at Epsom College and Caius College, Cambridge and training at St Mary's Hospital, he worked for twenty years as a general practitioner at a large country practice in Burwell on the fen borders of Cambridge, where he had spent his childhood. A career change in 1945 saw him become warden at the Field Studies Council's Flatford Mill Field Centre, and from 1950, founder and director of the Monks' House Bird Observatory at Seahouses, Northumberland, which he wrote about in The House on the Shore. Ennion was a founder member and Honorary Vice President of the Society of Wildlife Artists.

His son, Hugh, is also an accomplished artist.

== Publications ==
- Adventurers Fen, Methuen (1942) ASIN B000X8EB86
- The British Bird Oxford University Press (1943)
- The story of migration, G.G. Harrap (1947)
- Life on the Sea Shore, Oxford University Press (1948)
- East Anglia, Issue 6 of The new naturalist (1949)
- The Lapwing, Methuen (1949)
- Cambridgeshire Huntingdonshire and the Isle of Ely, Robert Hale (1951)
- Field Study Books, (1952)
- Ornithological report for Northumberland and Durham for 1956, Natural History Society of Northumberland, Durham and Newcastle upon Tyne (1957)
- Bird study in a garden: a book for bird watchers, Penguin (1958)
- The House on the Shore: The Story of Monks' House Bird Observatory, Routledge and Kegan Paul (1960)
- Birdwatching, Pelham (1963)
- Tracks, Clarendon (1967)
- The Clue Book BIRDS Oxford University Press (1968 - reprinted with corrections 1970, 1973)
- Birds and Seasons (introduction by Bob Walthew) Arlequin Press (1994) ISBN 0-9522019-2-5
- The Living Birds of Eric Ennion (Victor Gollancz Ltd, London 1982 ISBN 0-575-03157-3

=== Biography ===
- Eric Ennion: A Life of Birds by Bob Walthew; introduction by Robert Gillmor, The Wildlife Art Gallery (2003) ISBN 0-9526236-5-X

== See also ==
- List of wildlife artists
