= Robert Gillmor =

English painter (1936–2022)

Robert Gillmor MBE
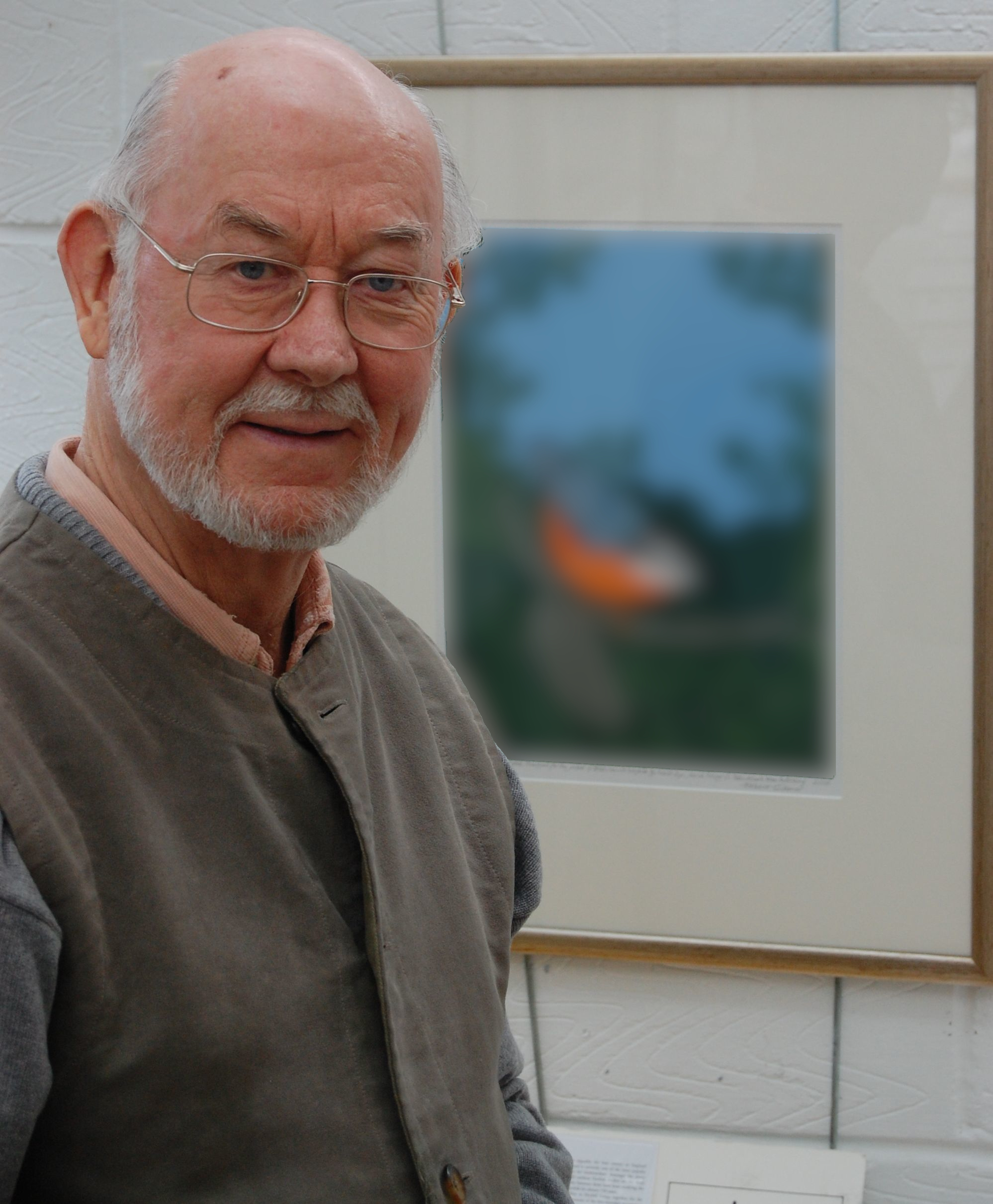
- Gillmor in March 2010, at Nature in Art, in front of a linocut of his cover art for Birds New to Norfolk, depicting a red-breasted nuthatch
- Born: 6 July 1936; Reading, Berkshire, England
- Died: 8 May 2022 (aged 85); Cley next the Sea, Norfolk, England
- Education: Leighton Park School, Reading; School of Fine Art at Reading University
- Occupations: Artist and illustrator
- Notable work: New Naturalist book jackets since 1985.
- Awards: RSPB Medal

Robert Allen Fitzwilliam Gillmor MBE (6 July 1936 – 8 May 2022) was a British ornithologist, artist, illustrator, author and editor. He was a co-founder of the Society of Wildlife Artists (SWLA) and was its secretary, chairman and president. He contributed to over 100 books, and received numerous awards.

== Early life and education ==
Robert Allen Fitzwilliam Gillmor was born in Reading, Berkshire on 6 July 1936, and educated at Leighton Park School and the School of Fine Art at Reading University. He was just 16 when his illustrations were first published, in the monthly magazine British Birds. When he was a student in the art department of Reading University, he illustrated his first book, A Study of Blackbirds. Gillmor taught art and craft at his old school, Leighton Park in Reading, for six years before commencing a freelance career as a wildlife artist in 1965.

Aged 13, he was the first ever junior member elected by the Reading Ornithological Club (later Berkshire Ornithological Club) and went on to illustrate the covers of its annual reports from 1950. He was eventually made the club's life president.

== Career ==
Gillmor's output was enormous and in a variety of forms, line drawing watercolour, lino-cuts and silk screen. After his first book in 1958, his work appeared in over 100 others.

Moving from Reading to Cley next the Sea in Norfolk in 1998 proved an inspiring influence on his work. He resumed making lino-cuts. He was also a keen ornithologist, and served on council for all three of the national organisations, RSPB, British Ornithologists' Union and the British Trust for Ornithology. He designed the first version of the RSPB's Avocet logo. He was a long-standing member (and former president) of the Reading Guild of Artists.

== SWLA ==
After founding the Society of Wildlife Artists with Eric Ennion in the early 1960s, Robert served as its secretary and chairman for many years. He was also elected president in 1984 and served for two five-year periods, he also served as a vice-president of the society. As well as working to promote current work, he did much to promote work of past artists, including Charles Tunnicliffe, (editing three books) and his grandfather, Professor Allen W. Seaby (1867–1953), who instilled in him a love of printmaking.

== Later life and death ==
In 2011, Gillmor completed lino-cuts for four sets of postage stamps for Royal Mail, with a further three sets (of six stamps each) in 2012. He designed the British Trust for Ornithology's Dilys Breese Medal, first awarded in 2009.

A retrospective of Gillmor's work was exhibited at Reading Museum from 23 October 2011 to 29 April 2012.

In the 2015 Birthday Honours he was appointed a Member of the Order of the British Empire (MBE), "for services to Wildlife Art". His other awards included the RSPB Medal (2001), and the Union Medal of the British Ornithological Union (1997).

Gillmor died at his home, North Light, in Cley next the Sea, Norfolk, on 8 May 2022, following a lengthy period of ill-health. He was 85. He was survived by his wife and fellow artist, Susan (née Norman; they married in 1974), and children Emily (also a wildlife artist) and Thomas.

== Works ==
- — (2006). Cutting Away: the linocuts of Robert Gillmor. Peterborough. ISBN 978-1-904078-14-2. Archived from the original on 1 November 2011.
- — (2011). Birds, Blocks and Stamps: Post & Go Birds of Britain. Reading: Two Rivers Press. ISBN 978-1-901677-79-9.
- — (2013). Cover Birds. Two Rivers Press. ISBN 978-1901677966.
- — (2014). Robert Gillmor's Norfolk Bird Sketches.
- — (2018). Pressing On: A Decade of New Linocuts. Mascot Media Ltd. ISBN 9781999845711.

=== As editor ===
- Tunnicliffe, Charles (1981). Sketches of Bird Life. Gollancz. ISBN 0-575-03036-4.

=== As art editor ===
- The Birds of the Western Palaearctic, nine volumes, 1977–1994
- Birds of Berkshire, 1996

=== As illustrator ===
- David Snow. A Study of Blackbirds. – Gillmor's first book, undertaken while a student
- J. Denis Summers-Smith (1988). The Sparrows. ISBN 9780856610486.
- J. Denis Summers-Smith. The Tree Sparrow.
- Tony Soper (2006). The Bird Table Book. ISBN 978-0-7153-2413-4.
- Dye, Keith; Fiszer, Mick; Allard, Peter R. (2009). Birds New to Norfolk. ISBN 978-0-9542545-3-7.
- Clare, John (1982). Eric Robinson and Richard Fitter (ed.). John Clare's Birds. Oxford. ISBN 0192129775.
- Wood, J. Duncan (2003). Horace Alexander: 1889 to 1989: Birds and Binoculars. York: William Sessions Limited. ISBN 1-85072-289-7.
- The dust jackets of each of the New Naturalist series since 1985.
