= Carl Brenders =

Belgian naturalist and painter

Carl Brenders (born 1937) is a naturalist and painter, born near Antwerp, Belgium. The painter is most famous for his detailed and lifelike paintings of wildlife.

Some of the artist's accomplishments include illustrations of wildlife for La Vie secrète des bêtes, a book series (published in English as Nature's Hidden World), and being named the 24th Master Artist at the 2002 Birds in Art exhibition at Leigh Yawkey Woodson Art Museum in Wausau, Wisconsin. His art is the subject of the books, Wildlife: The Nature Paintings of Carl Brenders, Song of Creation, and Pride of Place: The Art of Carl Brenders. Thirty of the artist's works were a part of the major retrospective exhibition Artistry in Nature: The Wildlife Paintings of Carl Brenders which opened at the Carnegie Museum of Natural History in Pittsburgh, Pennsylvania, and then traveled to Cleveland, Ohio, Louisville, Kentucky, and Shreveport, Louisiana.

Brenders shared his perspectives on God, beauty and art in his 1994 book Wildlife: The Nature Paintings of Carl Benders, "I am not a philosopher, I just paint animals... If there is a God, He is in nature" and, "With all the ugliness in the world, I am thirsty for beauty." He also shared his father's perspective, "My father said before he died, 'Boy, all beauty is in nature.'"

Wildlife artist Robert Bateman wrote, “Carl is, after all, from Flanders. He takes us out of doors and his birds and mammals are very much alive, but his art is part of that same great tradition. Carl is a Flemish master.”

Carl and his wife Paula make their home in Antwerp. They travel yearly to America for fieldwork while attending the annual Birds in Art exhibition.
