= Richard Sloan (artist) =

American artist

Richard Sloan (1935–2007) was an American artist. He painted wildlife in Arizona and in rainforests.

Considered to be North America's "Dean Of Rainforest Painters", Sloan was born in Chicago, Illinois, where he attended the America Academy Of Art. He then worked as an advertising illustrator before joining Chicago's Lincoln Park Zoo as staff artist. After a 1966 sellout solo exhibition at the Abercrombie & Fitch Gallery in Chicago, Sloan left Lincoln Park to embark upon a lifetime of capturing the world's rainforests in paint. He was the first wildlife artist in North America to turn all his efforts as a painter to documenting exotic animals of the world's tropics.

He first traveled to British Guiana (Guyana) in 1969 and made seventeen expeditions to the Amazon Basin, the Peruvian Andes, Guatemala, Trinidad and Tobago, Belize, Mexico's Yucatán Peninsula and Thailand.

His paintings have been exhibited at the National Geographic Society's Explorers Hall, the American Museum of Natural History, the Carnegie Museum of Art, the Gilcrease Museum, the Royal Scottish Academy and numerous other museums and galleries.

Since 1979 his work has been included in twenty-five Leigh Yawkey Woodson Art Museum Birds In Art exhibitions, and in 1994 the Museum conferred upon Sloan the honor of Master Wildlife Artist. In March 2002 at the invitational, juried exhibition Impressions Of Bonnet House in Ft. Lauderdale, Florida, he was given the Peoples Choice Award.

His works are included in the permanent collections of the Smithsonian Institution, Leigh Yawkey Woodson Art Museum, the Illinois State Museum, the Denver Museum of Natural History, the North Carolina Museum Of Natural Sciences and private collections throughout the world.

He has been commissioned by the World Wildlife Fund to design postage stamps and first day covers for Trinidad, Tobago, Guatemala, the Philippines and the Falkland Islands. In the spring of 1998, the University Of Arizona Press published The Raptors Of Arizona, a 220-page volume on the birds of prey of the American Southwest, featuring 42 Sloan paintings. In recognition of this work, in August, 2003, he was inducted into the Arizona Outdoor Hall of Fame.

== Special achievements ==
2003 - Arizona Outdoor Hall Of Fame For "The Raptors Of Arizona"

1998 - Award Of Excellence / Society Of Animal Artists For "The Wild Bunch"

1994 - Master Wildlife Artist / The Leigh Yawkey Woodson Art Museum

1990 - Award Of Excellence / Society Of Animal Artists For "Amazon Backwater"

== Collections ==
2005 - Art Institute of the Arizona-Sonora Desert Museum - Burrowing Owls at sunrise

1993 - Arizona Wildlife Foundation - 42 Original Paintings for "The Raptors Of Arizona"

1992 - Leigh Yawkey Woodson Art Museum - Original Painting "Triple Threat"

1968 - Smithsonian Institution - "Eastern Bluebirds"

== Publications ==
The Best Of Wildlife Art 2 (1999) 3 Illustrations - Author: Rachel Rubin Wolf Published by: North Light Books

Wildlife Art (1999) 1 Illustration - Author: Alan Singer Published by: Rockport Publishers, Inc.

The Raptors Of Arizona (1998) 42 Habitat Paintings - A 220-page hard cover volume containing the latest scientific information on all Birds Of Prey occurring in Arizona. Author: Richard Glinski Published by: University Of Arizona Press

Modern Wildlife Painting (1998) 1 Illustration - Author: Nicholis Hammond Published by: Yale University Press

The Best of Wildlife Art (1997) 1 Illustration - Author: Rachel Rubin Wolf Published by: North Light Books

More Wildlife Painting - Techniques Of The Modern Masters (1996) 7 Illustrations - Author: Susan Rayfield Published by: Watson Guptill

Painting Birds Step by Step (1996) 4 Illustrations - Author: Bart Rulon Published by: North Light Books

Raptors...Forests...Ruins / The World Of Richard Sloan (1993) 3 Illustrations - Magazine Article Author: Tyler Granville Published by: Informart

From Hawks To Hornbills & Back Again / The Art Of Richard Sloan (1991) 8 Illustrations - Magazine Article Author: Judy Hughes Published by: Wildlife Art News

The Art Of Richard Sloan (1989) Cover Art / Frigate Birds In Flight - Magazine Published by: U.S.Art

Artist Of The Ancient Forest (1986) 5 Illustrations - Author: Jay Heinrichs Published by: International Wildlife / The National Wildlife Federation
