= Nature in Art =

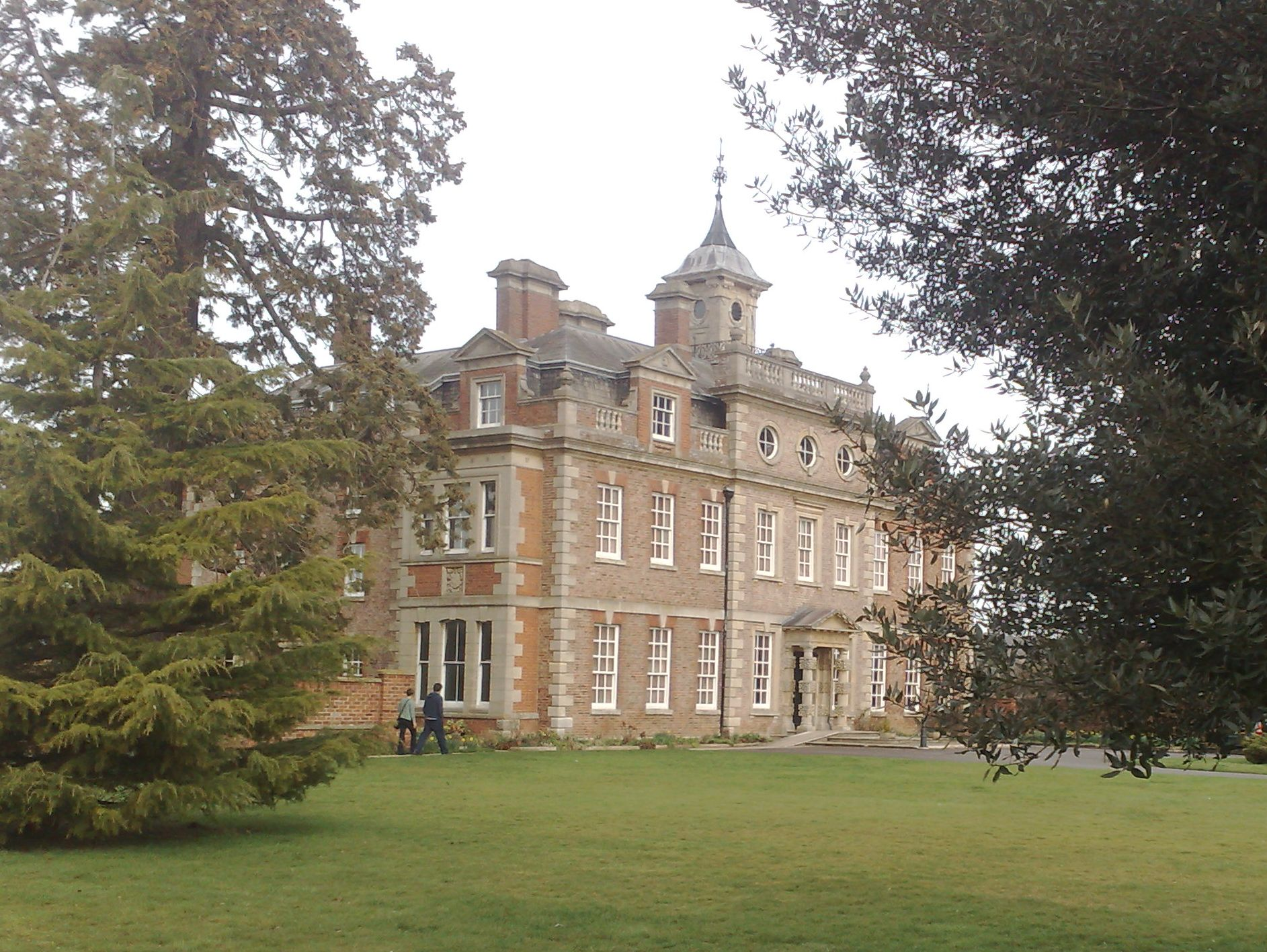
- Wallsworth Hall
- Location: Wallsworth Hall, Twigworth, Gloucester, England
- Coordinates: 51.905731°N 2.232628°W
- Type: Art gallery
- Website: natureinart.org.uk

Nature in Art is a museum and art gallery at Wallsworth Hall, Twigworth, Gloucester, England, dedicated exclusively to art inspired by nature in all forms, styles and media. The museum has twice been specially commended in the National Heritage Museum of the Year Awards.

== Trust ==
The gallery is operated by the Nature in Art Trust, a registered charity (No: 1000553) set up in 1982 as the "Society for Wildlife Art of the Nations". The trust purchased Wallsworth Hall in 1987. The Trust's patron is Princess Alexandra. Its President, until her death in January 2010, was Lady Philippa Scott, who had succeeded her husband Sir Peter Scott in that role. Its vice-presidents are Dr. Heather Angel, Dr. David Bellamy, Sonja Fuchs, Lord Griffiths of Fforestfach, David Gower, David Lank, Professor Sir Ghillean Prance, Dr. Shirley Sherwood, and Judge David Turner.

== Exhibits ==
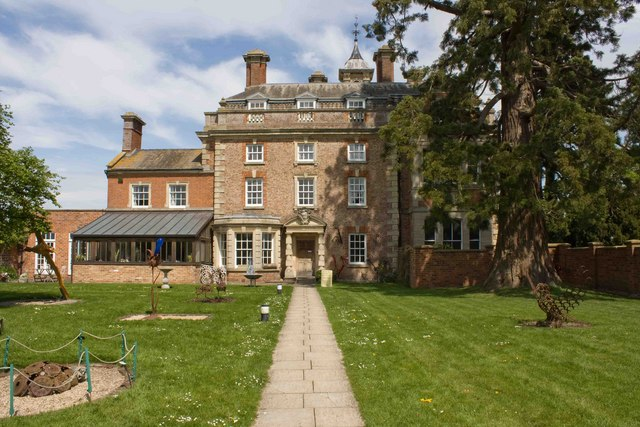
Sculpture Garden at Wallsworth Hall

Among its permanent collection are works by notable nature artists including Eric Ennion, George Edward Lodge, David Shepherd, Archibald Thorburn and Charles Tunnicliffe; as well as more general artists such as Pablo Picasso.

The gallery holds regular exhibitions of loaned works; subjects of those dedicated to the work of a single artist have included Joy Adamson, Peter Scott and David Shepherd. Other visiting exhibitions have included the annual Wildlife Photographer of the Year.
