= List of pin-up artists =

This is a list of notable artists who work primarily in the medium of the pin-up.

== A ==
- Chris Achilléos
- Arnold Armitage
- Rolf Armstrong
- Aslan

== B ==
- Joyce Ballantyne
- McClelland Barclay
- Vaughan Alden Bass
- Ben-Hur Baz
- Julie Bell
- Earle K. Bergey
- Roy Best
- Charles Binger
- Enoch Bolles
- Mark Boyle
- Harry C. Bradley
- Duane Bryers
- Al Buell

== C ==
- J. Scott Campbell
- Joe Chiodo
- Chris Cooper
- Howard Chandler Christy

== D ==
- Olivia De Berardinis
- Ruth Deckard
- Joseph F. DeMartini
- Archie Dickens
- Jessica Dougherty
- Peter Driben

== E ==
- Edward M. Eggleston
- Gil Elvgren
- Harry Ekman

== F ==
- Fred Lincot
- Pearl Frush
- Arthur Ferrier

== G ==
- Jacob Gestman Geradts
- Charles Dana Gibson
- Shane Glines

== H ==
- Greg Hildebrandt
- Josh Howard
- Adam Hughes
- Jon Hul

== I ==
- Idda van Munster

== K ==
- Irving Klaw

== L ==
- Joseph Michael Linsner

== M ==
- Milo Manara
- Nathaniel Milljour
- Earl Moran
- Zoë Mozert

== N ==
- Patrick Nagel

== O ==
- Jackie Ormes

== P ==
- George Petty
- Coles Phillips
- Jay Scott Pike
- Norman Pett

== R ==
- Mel Ramos
- Virgil Reilly
- Al Rio
- Luis Royo
- Donald L. Rust

== S ==
- Arthur Sarnoff
- Hajime Sorayama
- Annie Sprinkle
- Dave Stevens
- Marjorie Strider
- Haddon Sundblom

== T ==
- Bruce Timm

== V ==
- Boris Vallejo
- Alberto Vargas
- Baron Von Lind

== W ==
- Bill Ward
- Ted Withers
- David Wright

== Y ==
- Dean Yeagle
