= Pearl Frush =

American pin-up illustration artist

Pearl Alice Frush (March 20, 1907 – December 1986) was an American pin-up and glamour illustration artist during the golden era of the calendar art market. Pearl ranked amongst the top three female glamour artists, along with Joyce Ballantyne, and Zoë Mozert. They were a rare "Girl's Club" within the predominantly male pin-up masters of mid-century illustration: Alberto Vargas, George Petty, and Gil Elvgren. According to the co-author of The Great American Pin-Up, Louis K. Meisel, "Frush's technical brilliance was such that, upon close examination, her works even begin to take on a photographic clarity. Those knowledgeable collectors who have studied her paintings have often judged her the equal of Alberto Vargas in artistic excellence." Like Vargas she depicted women in provocative poses, however, she showed them with more proportional bodies than Vargas. She sometimes signed her paintings with her [then] married names "Pearl Frush-Brudon" or "Pearl Mann". One of her most recognizable and enduring contributions to American advertising iconography was her original rendering of Little Debbie® McKee, for McKee Foods in 1960.

== Life and career ==
Pearl Alice Frush was born in Sioux City, Woodbury, Iowa, March 20, 1907. Her family moved to the Mississippi Gold Coast when she was young. She studied art in New Orleans, Philadelphia, and New York City before eventually studying at the School of the Art Institute of Chicago under Charles Schroeder. She married Charles W. Brudon on September 20, 1934, in Cook County, Illinois (Chicago). The marriage license incorrectly lists her name as "Pearl Grush". In the late 1930s through early 1940s, Pearl Frush did freelance advertising work in Chicago. Her employers and publishers included Vogue-Wright Studios, Sundblom, Johnson & White, and Gerlach Barklow Co. in the nearby town of Joliet. They published many of her commercially successful pin-up calendars including those titled "Liberty Belles", "Girls of Glamour", and "Glamour Round the Clock".

Her "Aqua Tour" series, depicting women in aquatic settings, created such a splash that it broke the company's sales records. On June 19, 1942, Frush married for the second time in Cook County, Illinois, to George J. Krampert. By 1955, she had divorced George J. Krampert and married Robert Goodell Mann, a cellist with the Atlanta Symphony Orchestra. In Atlanta she began working with Brown and Bigelow.

She died Pearl F. Mann in December 1986 in Atlanta, Georgia.
