= Vaughan Alden Bass =

American painter of pin-up art

Vaughan Alden Bass was an American painter of pin-up art.

Bass was a Chicago artist who started his career working for the Louis F. Dow Company in St. Paul during the mid-1930s. Bass created his own pin-ups for Brown & Bigelow, but he worked for Dow as a "paint over" artist, redoing work that other artists (notably Gil Elvgren) had done for the company.

Bass' style was often compared with that of Elvgren, Al Buell, and Joyce Ballantyne. In the late 1950s, Bass did a series of wrestling scenes that demonstrated his comfort with any subject matter. He created the Wonder Bread Girl in the 1950s; the Wonder Bread girl, is modeled after his own daughter. His portrait of President Dwight D. Eisenhower is in the Smithsonian Institution in Washington, D.C.

== See also ==
- Pin-up girl
- List of pinup artists
