= Harry Ekman =

American artist

Harry Ekman (Chicago, 1923 – Medford, New Jersey, 1999) was an American graphic artist. His early influences were Gil Elvgren, Haddon Sundblom, Joyce Ballantyne. Ekman initially apprenticed with Sundblom who was a close family friend and by 1951 for Elvgren.

== Career ==
Ekman studied at the American Academy of Art and the Art Institute of Chicago. He is best remembered for his pin-up and advertising work. Working with Gil Elvgren, he is thought to have penned several of the iconic images attributed to Elvgren. By 1960, Ekman was making a transition from commercial illustration and pin-up art to portraiture. The rest of his career was devoted to gallery works and portraits.

== Sources ==
- The Great American Pin-Up, by Charles G. Martignette and Louis K. Meisel, ISBN 3-8228-1701-5
