= Roy Best =

American illustrator and painter (1892–?)

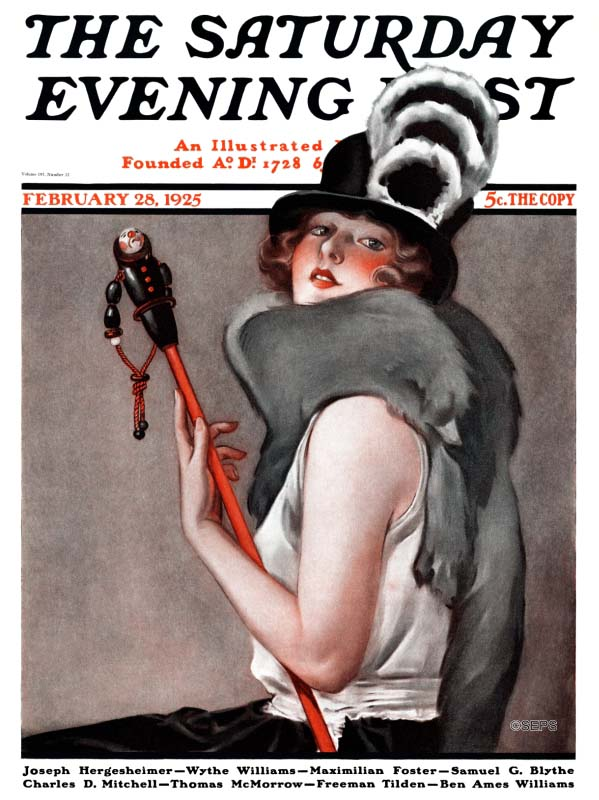
1925 Saturday Evening Post cover by Best

Roy Best (December 3, 1892 – ?) was an American illustrator and painter of pin-up girls.

== Biography ==
He was born in Waverly, Ohio on December 3, 1892, and attended the Art Institute of Cincinnati, working on a railroad construction crew to support himself. He later enrolled in the Art Institute of Chicago.

Later, Best was represented in New York City by American Artists. During this time he painted several covers for The Saturday Evening Post. By 1931, Best was painting pin-ups for the Joseph C. Hoover & Sons calendar company. That same year, he was commissioned by the Whitman Publishing Company to illustrate The Peter Pan Picture Book, based on J. M. Barrie's play Peter Pan; an illustration from this project was the basis for the Peter Pan Bus Lines logo. He illustrated many other children's books, including "Little Friends from Many Lands" by Mary Windsor (Whitman Publishing Company, 1935). He also painted a number of well-known actresses such as Grace Kelly.

In 1942, Best was commissioned by the Treasury's Section of Painting and Sculpture to paint a post office mural, Arrival of Packet, in his hometown of Waverly. Also in 1942, he was hired by Brown & Bigelow leading to a career producing calendar pin-ups.

In later years, he was known for his corporate-commissioned oil portraiture, and watercolor landscapes of Cape Cod, his retirement home.

== See also ==
- List of pinup artists
