= Zoë Mozert =

American illustrator and pin-up artist (1907–1993)

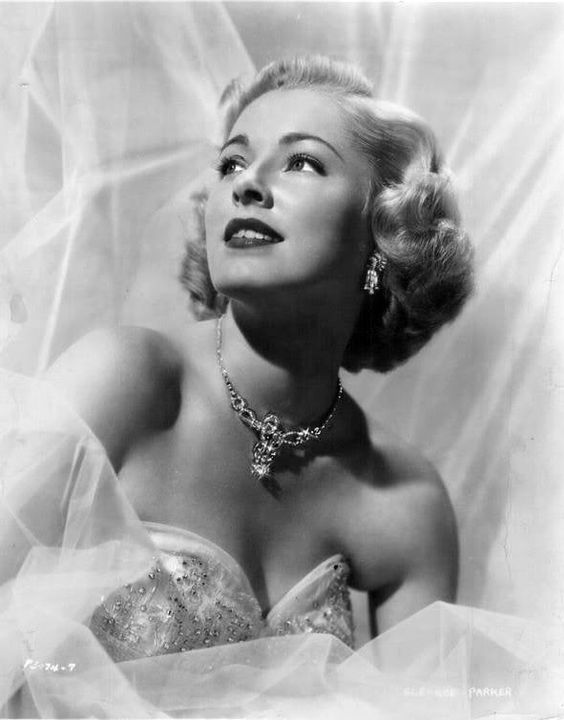
- Mozert in the 1940s
- Born: Alice Adelaide Moser; April 27, 1907; Colorado Springs, Colorado, U.S.
- Died: February 1, 1993 (aged 85); Flagstaff, Arizona, U.S.
- Known for: Painting

Zoë Mozert (/ˈmoʊzərt/; April 27, 1907 – February 1, 1993), born Alice Adelaide Moser, was an American illustrator. She was also known as one of the early 20th century's most famous pin-up artists and models.

== Career ==
In 1925 Mozert entered the Pennsylvania Museum School of Industrial Art where she studied under Thornton Oakley, a former student of Howard Pyle, and modeled to raise money for tuition.

During her career, Mozert painted hundreds of magazine covers and movie posters. She frequently was her own model, using cameras or mirrors to capture the pose. Her paintings are best known for their pastel style and realistic depiction of women.

In 1941, publishers Brown & Bigelow bought Mozert's first nude and signed her to an exclusive calendar contract. During World War II, her pin-up series for the company, called Victory Girls, was published both in calendar and mutoscope-card form. In 1946, Mozert created the publicity poster for Republic Pictures' Calendar Girl, a movie about the Gibson Girl. That same year, she painted the pinups for the Errol Flynn comedy Never Say Goodbye, in which Flynn played a pinup artist. (She also created the illustrations shown in the movie's opening credits.) By 1950, Mozert had become one of the "big four" illustrators nationally, along with Rolf Armstrong, Earl Moran and Gil Elvgren.

Some of Mozert's most famous works include the poster for Paramount Pictures' True Confession starring Carole Lombard, the poster for the Howard Hughes film The Outlaw with Jane Russell, and, her most popular image, Song of the Desert (1950).

== Gallery of selected works ==
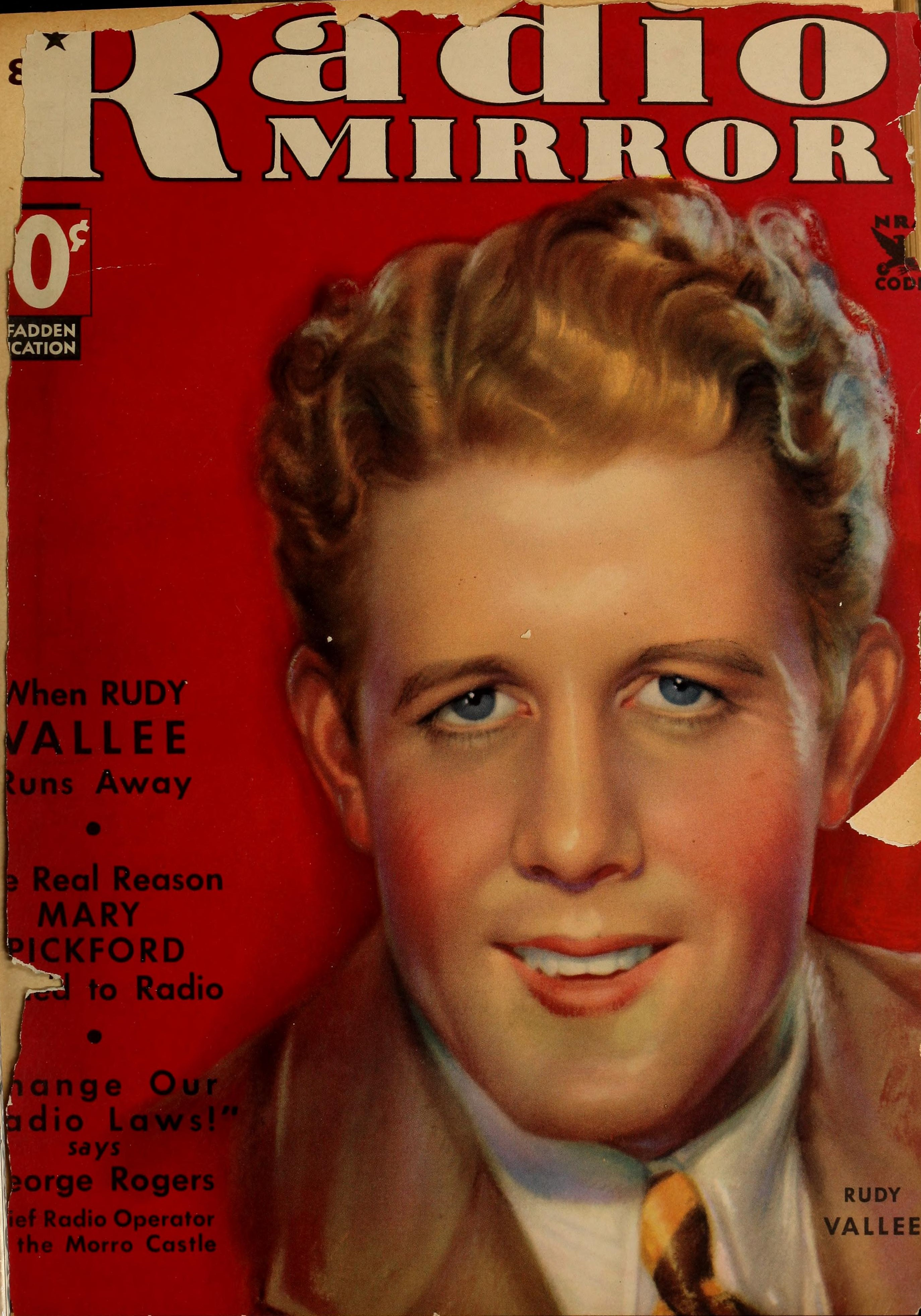
Rudy Vallee on the cover of Radio Mirror, December 1934, credited as A Mozert

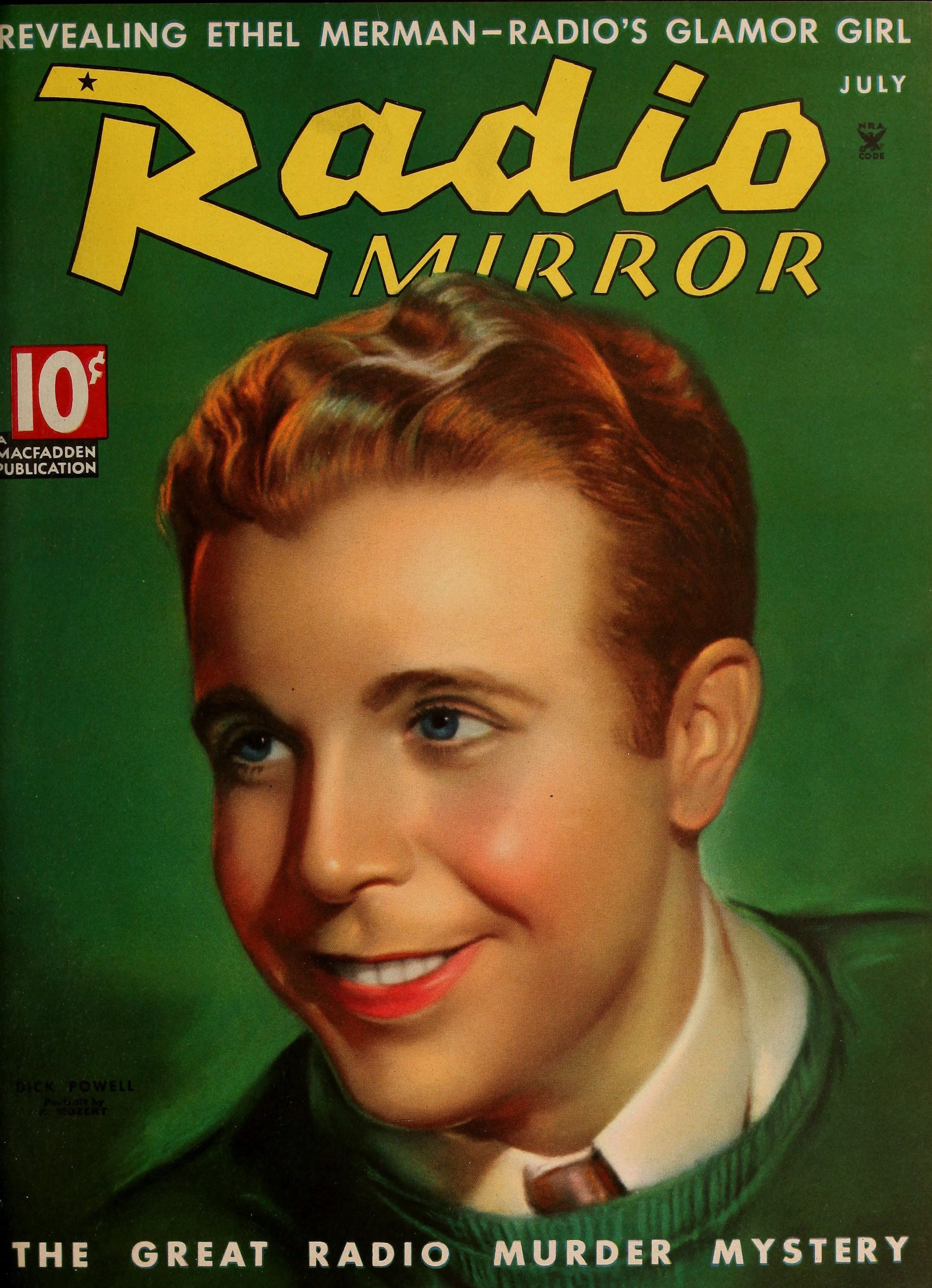
Dick Powell on the cover of Radio Mirror, July 1935, credited as A Mozert

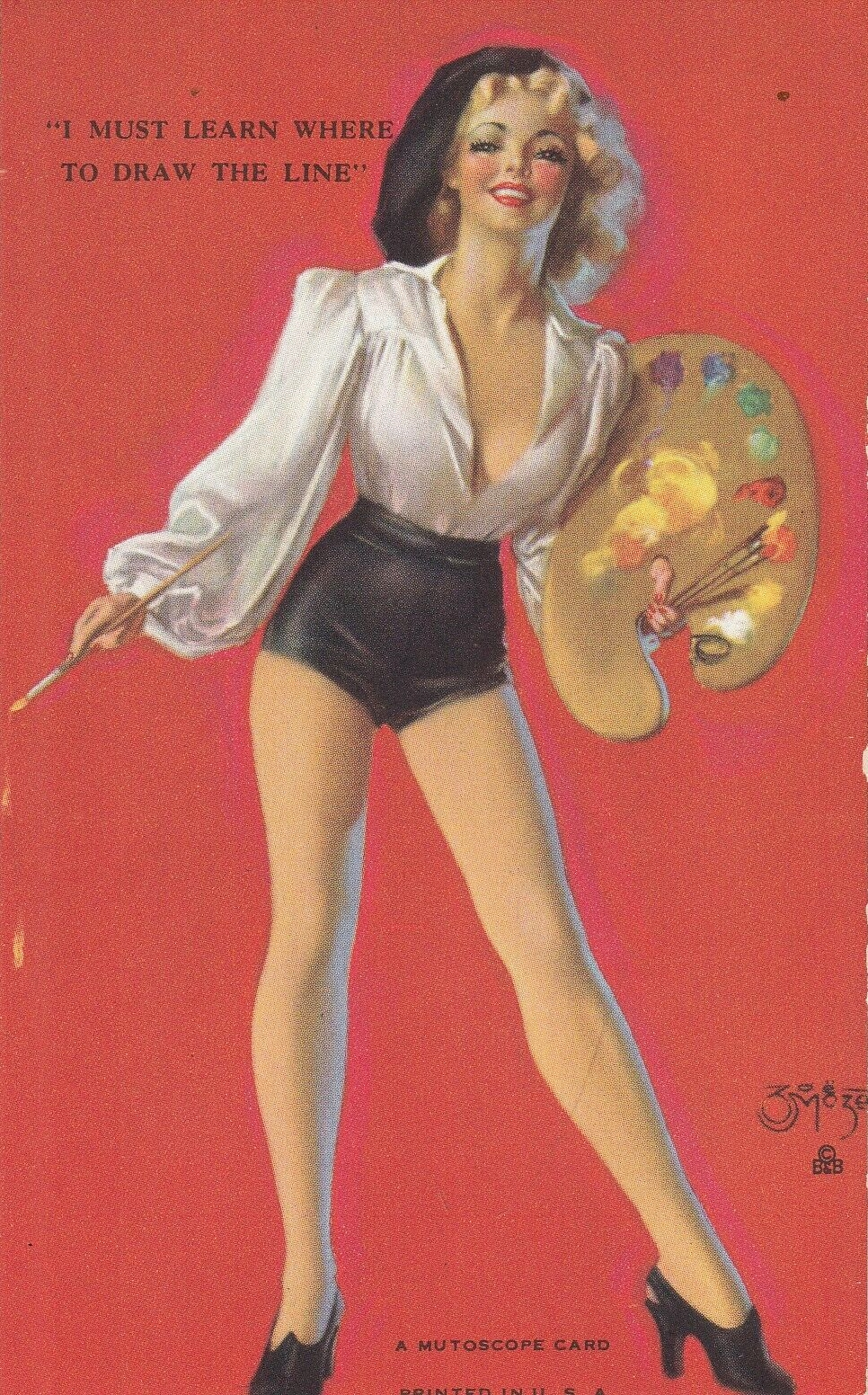
I Must Learn Where to Draw the Line, 1940s Mutoscope card

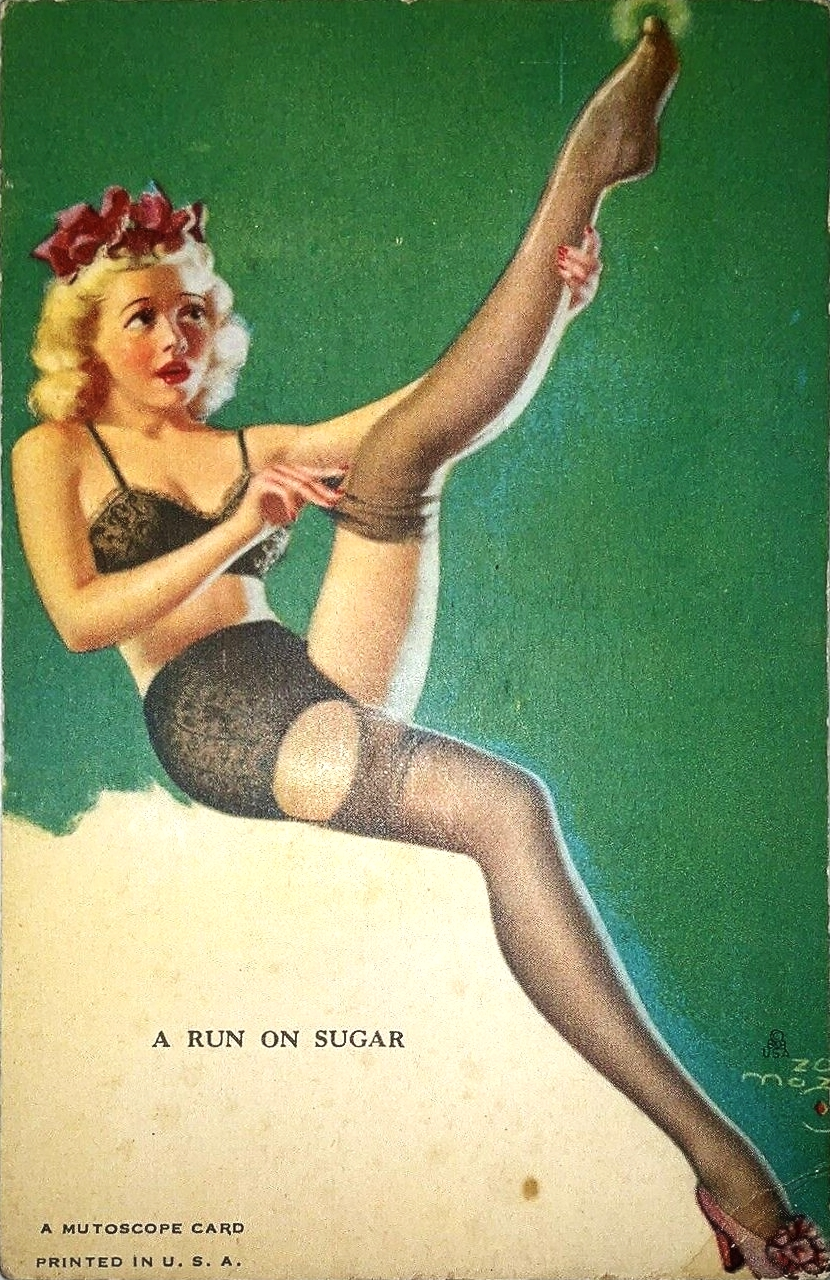
A Run on Sugar, 1940s Mutoscope card

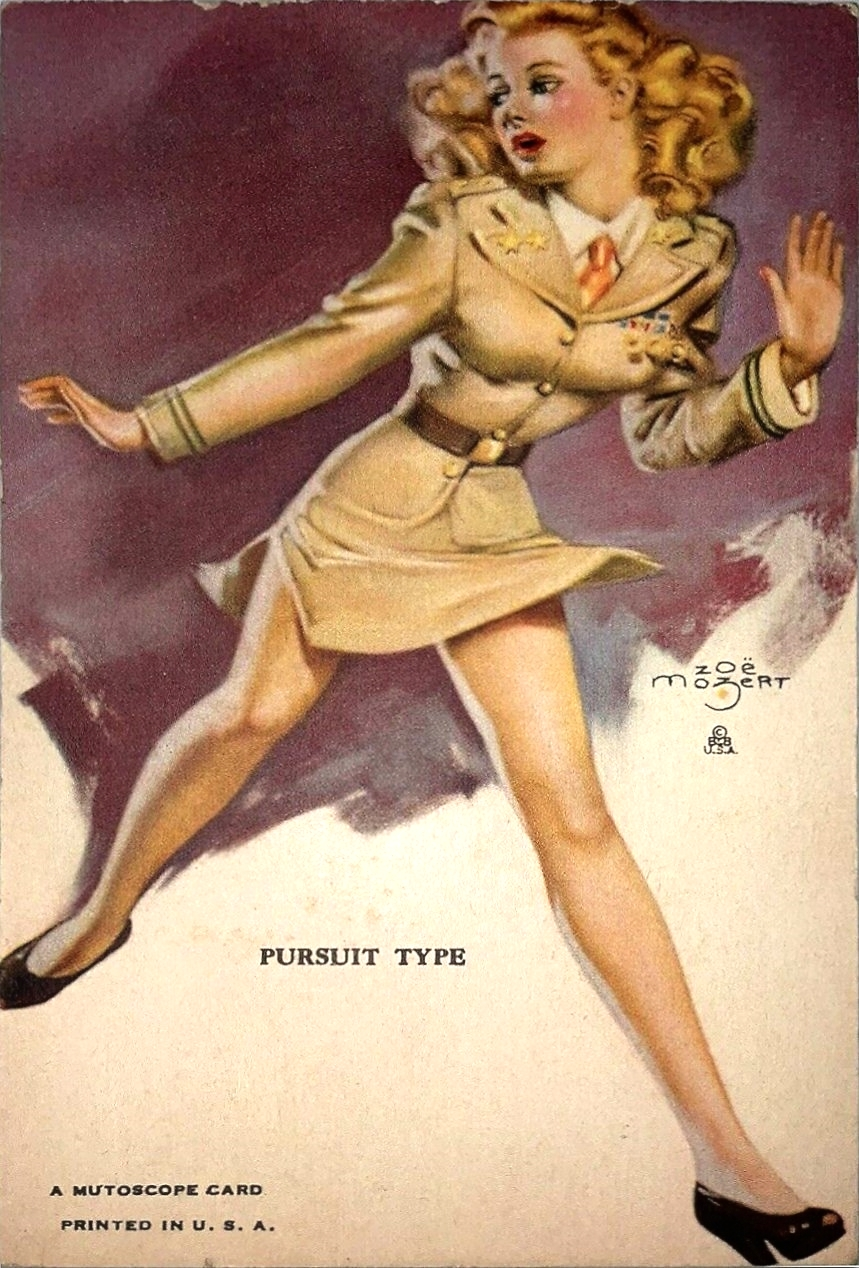
Pursuit Type, 1940s Mutoscope card

== See also ==
- List of pin-up artists
- The Outlaw (1943)
