= Santa suit =

Costume worn to portray Santa Claus

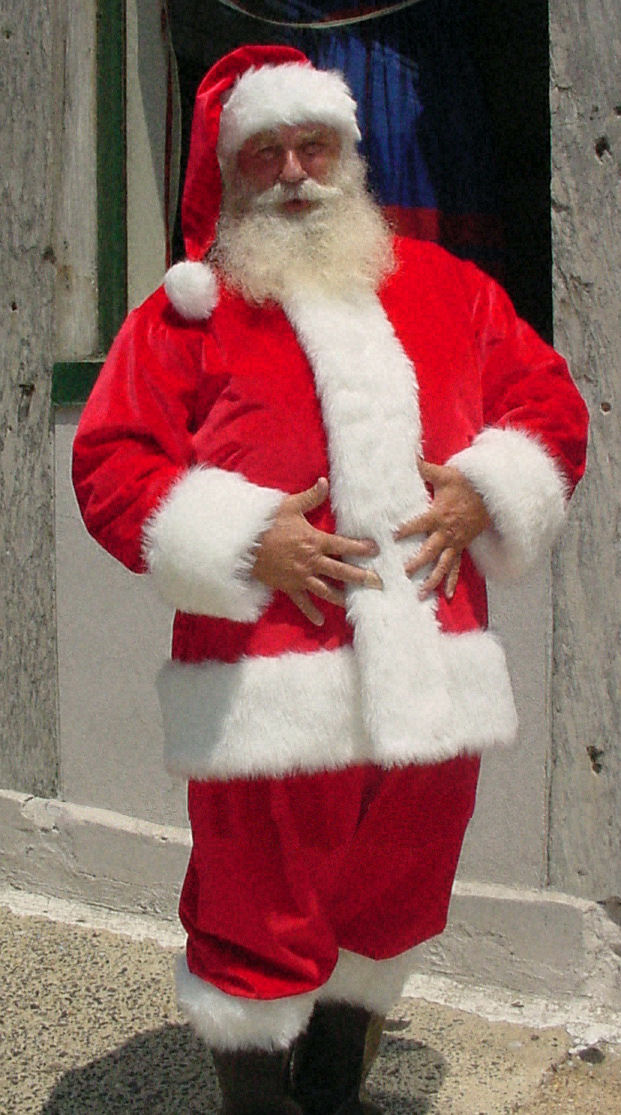
A red Santa suit, with white fur trim, stocking cap, and black boots. A wide buckled belt, typically included, is not present here.

A Santa suit is a suit worn by a person portraying the legendary figure Santa Claus. The modern American version of the suit can be attributed to the work of Thomas Nast for Harper's Weekly magazine, although it is often thought that Haddon Sundblom designed the suit in his advertising work for The Coca-Cola Company. Sundblom's work did standardize the western image of Santa, and popularized the image of the red suit with white fur trim. This has become the image of the American Santa, while in some European countries where Saint Nicholas remains popular, the outfit worn is closer to religious clothing, including a Bishop's mitre.

== History ==
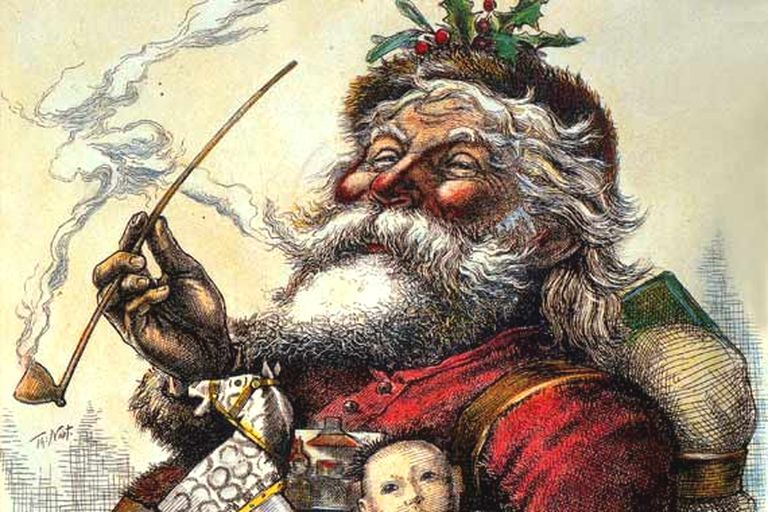
A Thomas Nast Santa, from 1881, wearing the modern Santa suit

The first appearance of a modern Santa Claus, complete with what we consider to be the Santa suit was in drawings by Thomas Nast. Nast's original drawings were of a small Santa who could slide down chimneys, but his later works made him full size. He was also the first to draw Santa wearing a red suit, a fur-lined stocking cap, and a wide belt with a large buckle.

Prior to Nast's work, Santa's outfit was tan in color, and it was he that changed it to red, although he also drew Santa in a green suit. This change is often attributed to the work of Haddon Sundblom, who drew images of Santa in advertising for the Coca-Cola Company since 1931. Although Sundblom's work certainly changed the perception of Santa Claus, the red suit was shown on the covers of Harper's Weekly at least forty years before his work for the soda company was published. The Coca-Cola Company itself has attributed the red color of the suit to Nast's earlier work. Prior to the Coca-Cola advertising, the image of Santa was in a state of flux. He was portrayed in a variety of forms, including both the modern forms and in some cases as a gnome. It was Sundblom's work which standardised the form of Santa to the earlier Nast work, including the red suit outfit.

== Design ==
There are regional differences in the type of suit that Santa Claus wears. Typically in the United States, which has also shaped Santa's "global" image through commercialisation, he wears a white fur trimmed red jacket and pants with a broad buckled belt, a matching hat, and black boots. In a number of regions where Saint Nicholas still remains popular (such as the Low Countries or Austria), the outfit is closer to that of the saint, being a long robe and a Bishop's mitre.

== See also ==
- List of hat styles
