= Ben-Hur Baz =

American pin-up painter

Ben-Hur Baz (1906–2003) was a painter of pin-up art.

Born in Mexico in 1906, Baz was a pin-up and glamour artist who became known in the late 1940s and 1950s, for his association with Esquire magazine. He painted pin-ups for their Gallery of Glamour and contributed to their calendars and centerfolds as well. Most well-known for his advertising illustrations for the cigarette industry including Lucky Strike and Pall Mall brands. His illustrations were elegant and popular during the 1950s. His illustrations with Esquire were contributions to multiple artists on some of their 1950 calendars.

Baz was extremely prolific. In addition to his work for Esquire, he provided story illustrations for mainstream magazines, worked on a number of national advertising campaigns, and was a successful paperback novel cover artist.

== See also ==
- Pin-up girl
- List of pinup artists
