= Arnold Armitage =

- Born: 1899
- Died: 1991 (aged 91–92)
- Occupation(s): Artist and Illustrator

Arnold Armitage (1899–1991) was a British-born artist and illustrator, best known for his work with pin-up art. He moved to the United States around 1925 and settled in Hollywood, California, working for the Foster and Kleiser Company, which produced billboards. During the 1930s, he developed a reputation as a designer specializing in billboards, and he designed many of these for American corporations.

About 1940, Armitage began a series of "pretty girl" paintings for the calendar market. While not strictly pin-ups, these works were very reminiscent of the work of Gil Elvgren. Armitage's pretty girls were well received in both the United States and England.

== See also ==
- Pin-up girl
- List of pinup artists
