= Rudensky =

Rudensky (masculine), Rudenskaya (feminine) is a surname. Notable people with the surname include:

- Alexander Rudensky (born 1956), American immunologist
- Andrey Rudensky (born 1959), Russian film and theater actor
- Igor Rudensky (born 1962), Russian politician
- Morris Rudensky (1898–1988), American gangster
