= Geradts =

Geradts is a Dutch surname. Notable people with the surname include:

- Evert Geradts (born 1943), Dutch cartoonist and former underground comics artist
- Jacob Gestman Geradts (born 1951), Dutch pin up artist
