= Idda van Munster =

Bosnian model and blogger (born 1990)

- Born: Aida Đapo; 5 June 1990 (age 35); Trebinje, SR Bosnia and Herzegovina, SFR Yugoslavia
- Occupations: Model, pin-up artist
- Years active: 2009–present
- Website: iddavanmunster.blogspot.com

Aida Đapo (born 5 June 1990), known by the pseudonym Idda van Munster, is a Bosnian blogger, model, and make-up artist. She is Bosnia's first pin-up girl. Her inspiration comes from the fashion and hairstyles of the 1920s to 1960s.

== Early life and inspiration ==
Đapo was born to an ethnic Muslim Bosniak family in the Herzegovinian town of Trebinje, located in southern Bosnia and Herzegovina.

Her favorite TV show as a child was The Munsters and her pseudonym Idda van Munster originates from her admiration of the "glamorous" character Marilyn Munster. Đapo also lists actress Marlene Dietrich as an inspiration.

== Career ==
She began an English-language blog on the website blogspot under the pseudonym Idda van Munster and her modeling career took off shortly thereafter.

Đapo appeared in the music video for "Ters Bosanka" by the Bosnian rock band Emir & Frozen Camels featuring singer Mirza Šoljanin. The video premiered 3 December 2013.

On 23 July 2013, the website BeautifulWomen named Đapo 2013's "The Most Beautiful Woman in the World."

== See also ==
- List of pin-up artists
