= Haddon Sundblom =

American graphic artist (1899–1976)

- Born: Haddon Hubbard Sundblom; June 22, 1899; Muskegon, Michigan, U.S.
- Died: March 10, 1976 (aged 76); Chicago, Illinois, U.S.
- Occupation: Artist

Haddon Hubbard "Sunny" Sundblom (June 22, 1899 – March 10, 1976) was an American artist best known for the images of Santa Claus he created for The Coca-Cola Company. Sundblom's friend Lou Prentice was the original model for the illustrator's Santa.

== Background ==
Sundblom was born in Muskegon, Michigan, to a Swedish-speaking family. His father, Karl Wilhelm Sundblom, was of the Swedish-speaking population of Finland and came from the farm Norrgårds in the village of Sonnboda in Föglö, Åland Islands, then part of the Russian Grand Duchy of Finland now Finland, while his mother Karin Andersson was from Sweden. Sundblom studied at the American Academy of Art.

== Career ==
Sundblom is best remembered for his advertising work, specifically the Santa Claus advertisement. It was he who depicted Santa Claus in a red suit when he painted for The Coca-Cola Company, starting in 1931. Sundblom's Claus firmly established the larger-than-life, grandfatherly Claus as a key figure in American Christmas imagery. So popular were Sundblom's images of Claus (Sundblom's images are used by Coca-Cola to this day) that Sundblom is often wrongly credited as having created the modern image of Santa Claus.

According to the Coca-Cola company: "For inspiration, Sundblom turned to Clement Clarke Moore's 1823 poem "A Visit From St. Nicholas" (commonly called "'Twas the Night Before Christmas"). Moore's description of St. Nick led to an image of Santa that was warm, friendly, pleasantly plump and human. For the next 33 years, Sundblom painted portraits of Santa that helped to create the modern image of Santa – an interpretation that today lives on in the minds of people of all ages, all over the world". Sundblom's family most likely also got Christmas greetings sent from Sweden and Finland, Åland. The cards in Sweden and Swedish-speaking Finland had motifs painted by Jenny Nyström of a friendly and charming jultomte (Santa) dressed in red and white.

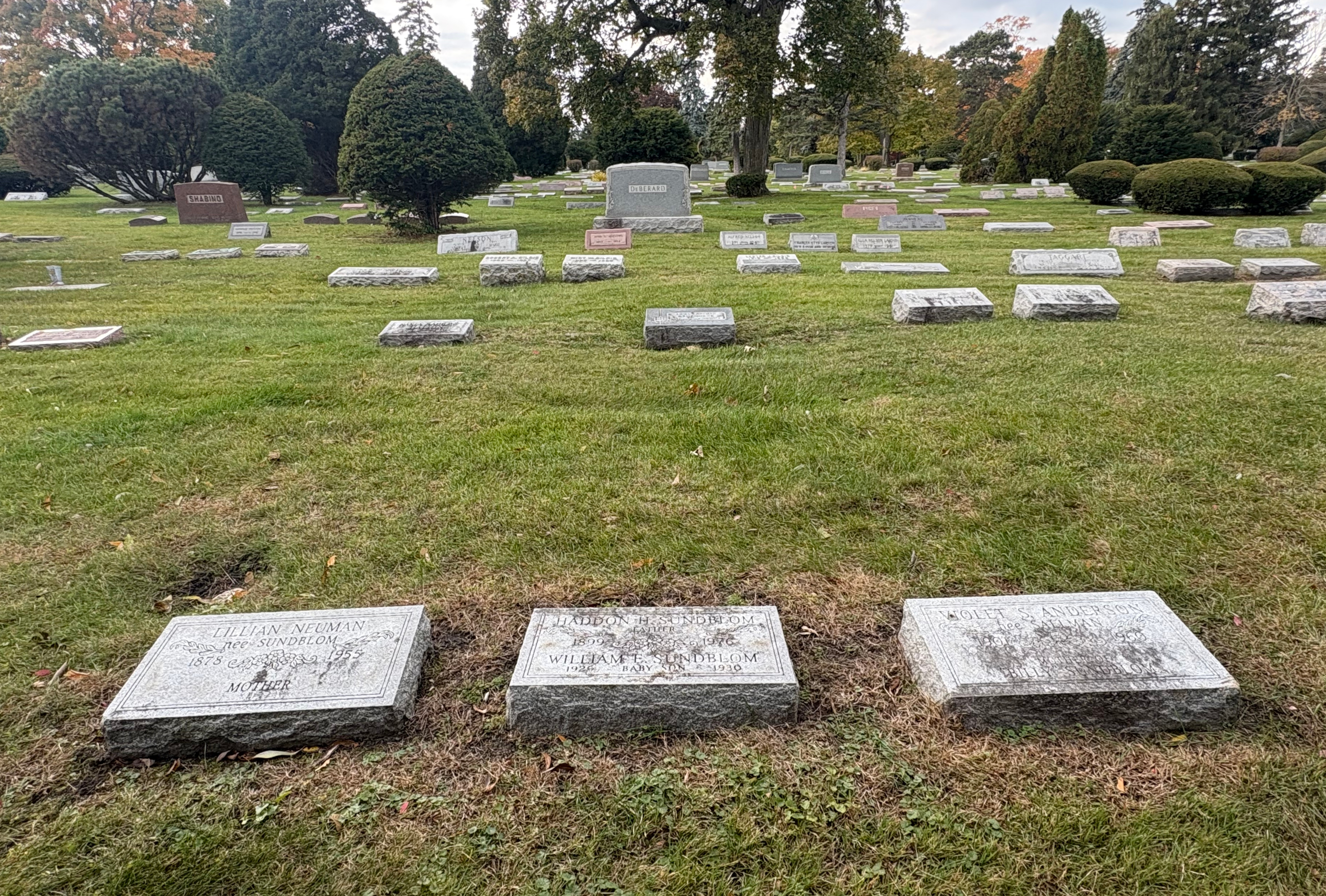
Sundblom's grave (center) at Memorial Park Cemetery

In 1942 Sundblom created Coke's mascot Sprite Boy, who appeared in print ads during the 1940s and 1950s.

Also in 1942 he was the artist for an iconic WWII United States Marine Corps recruitment poster. In it, a Marine Sergeant stands at parade rest with a headline that reads, "Ready - Join U.S. Marines Land Sea Air" and the copy continues at the bottom with, "Apply, or write, to nearest recruiting station."

Quaker Oats asked Sundblom to update their logo in 1957. He provided the colorful head-and-shoulders version which was on their packaging until 1969, when it was made over in blue and white by Saul Bass.

Sundblom is recognized as a major influence on many well known pin-up artists, such as Harold W. McCauley, Gil Elvgren, Andrew Loomis, Edward Runci, Joyce Ballantyne, Art Frahm, and Harry Ekman. In the mid-1930s, he began to paint pin-ups and glamour pieces for calendars. Sundblom's last assignment, in 1972, was a cover painting for Playboy's Christmas issue which included a short bio with his photo.

Sundblom died at Edgewater Hospital in Chicago in 1976, and was buried at Memorial Park Cemetery in Skokie.

== See also ==
- Jenny Nyström
