= The Petty Girl =

1950 film by Henry Levin

- Directed by: Henry Levin
- Screenplay by: Nat Perrin
- Based on: Unpublished story by Mary McCarthy
- Produced by: Nat Perrin
- Starring: Robert Cummings; Joan Caulfield; Elsa Lanchester
- Cinematography: William E. Snyder
- Edited by: Al Clark
- Music by: George Duning; Werner R. Heymann
- Production company: Columbia Pictures
- Distributed by: Columbia Pictures
- Release dates: August 17, 1950 (New York); September 1, 1950 (Los Angeles)
- Running time: 86–88 minutes
- Country: United States
- Language: English
- Box office: $1,250,000

The Petty Girl (1950), known in the UK as Girl of the Year, is a musical romantic comedy Technicolor film starring Robert Cummings and Joan Caulfield. Cummings portrays painter George Petty, who falls for Victoria Braymore (Caulfield), the youngest professor at Braymore College.

== Plot ==
In New York, George Petty tries to convince auto manufacturer B. J. Manton to feature pretty women in advertisements for his dreary new car model. Manton's daughter Connie meets George and makes herself his patron. She furnishes him with a lavish apartment, complete with a butler named Beardsley. She also talks him into abandoning his cheesecake paintings in favor of more respectable portraits.

Victoria Braymore, the youngest professor at Braymore College, attends a conference in New York to defend the school against charges that it is outdated and old-fashioned. She has led a sheltered life, raised by the older professors after the death of her parents, and is only allowed to attend with a chaperone, her friend Dr. Crutcher.

George meets Victoria in an art museum. She resists his advances but finally agrees to dinner, but only if he can find a date for Dr. Crutcher. George convinces Beardsley to pretend to be his uncle Ben. The dinner is a disaster; Beardsley becomes drunk, Dr. Crutcher thinks that she is George's date and Victoria is distant. George leaves and Victoria accompanies him to a nightclub frequented by artists. When a drink is spilled on her dress, she goes to the powder room, where the attendant offers to iron it. The police raid the club and Victoria, who had been in the ladies' room, is arrested dressed only in her slip, and her picture is published on the front page of the newspaper.

After Victoria is released from jail, she returns to Braymore. George follows her and takes a job as a busboy at the faculty residence. Using the newspaper photograph, he blackmails Victoria to date him, but their first two dates end badly. While posing for a painting in George's room, she is seen by nosy Professor Whitman, who misinterprets the situation. Although the other professors are inclined to leniency, Victoria quits.

Victoria visits George's apartment, where she meets Connie, her rival for his affections. She tries to persuade George that Connie is doing the same thing to him that the professors had done to her, molding him to satisfy her wishes and expectations, but he disagrees. Victoria sneaks into the art museum and replaces a painting with one that George had painted depicting her wearing a bathing suit. The resulting publicity lands her a starring role in a burlesque show. Embarrassed, George obtains an injunction preventing her from performing as the "Petty Girl".

As the injunction only applies to public places, Victoria crashes Connie's stuffy private party where a male quartet and 12 beautiful women perform a musical number, much to the appreciation of B. J. Manton, who changes his mind about George's initial proposal. George realizes that Victoria is right, and they kiss and reconcile.

== Cast ==
- Robert Cummings as George Petty
- Joan Caulfield as Professor Victoria Braymore
- Elsa Lanchester as Dr. Crutcher
- Melville Cooper as Beardsley
- Audrey Long as Mrs. Connie Manton Dezlow
- Mary Wickes as Professor Whitman
- Frank Orth as Moody, process server
- John Ridgely as Patrolman
- Dorothy Abbott as December Petty Girl
- Joan Larkin as July Petty Girl
- Tippi Hedren as Ice Box Petty Girl (uncredited)
- Vivian Mason as Lovey

== Production ==
In October 1942, RKO Pictures signed an agreement with pin-up artist George Petty to produce a film based on his life and work titled The Petty Girl. Petty's daughter had been a model for his series of "Petty Girl" paintings, but RKO wanted an unknown to play the lead role and conducted a nationwide search. Bert Gannet was assigned to work on a script, and a series of unknown women were cast, in addition to Virginia Mayo.

The film did not materialize, and RKO sold the rights to Columbia Pictures. By January 1947, Ann Miller was cast in the title role and Devery Freeman had written the script.

Production was repeatedly delayed and Columbia officially reactivated the project in March 1949, with Nat Perrin to produce and Charles Vidor to direct. In July, Robert Cummings was cast in the male lead role, and It's a Man's World, for which he was previously announced at Columbia, was postponed.

Joan Caulfield lobbied to star in the film because it was a sexier sort of role than she had played in the past, and she joined the film in July.

In early August 1949, director Charles Vidor visited Lake Arrowhead to scout locations, with filming scheduled to begin on August 21. However, Vidor was suspended by Columbia for refusing to work on the film, and Henry Levin was assigned as director. However, Vidor denied that he had refused to direct the film. Columbia then claimed that Vidor had objected to the story and made no attempt to prepare for the film, but Vidor asserted that he had been willing to work. The case was settled out of court and filming began on September 6, 1949.

== Music ==
For all songs, the music was composed by Harold Arlen, with lyrics by Johnny Mercer.

- "Fancy Free", performed by Joan Caulfield (dubbed by an uncredited Carol Richards)
- "Calypso Song", performed at the beginning by Movita, segueing to Caulfield in a daydream sequence (both dubbed by Richards)
- "I Loves Ya", performed by Robert Cummings (dubbed by Hal Derwin) and Caulfield (Richards)
- "The Petty Girl", performed by Caulfield (Richards), the Petty Girls and a male quartet

== Release ==
Janis Carter embarked on a 26-city appearance tour to promote the film.

== Reception ==
In a contemporary review for The New York Times, critic Thomas M. Pryor wrote: "Miss Caulfield comes on the screen in scanties and cavorts about her room at stuffy Braymore College while draping herself with clothing in the very best Ann Corio manner. Sly fellows, those movie producers, for all their Production Code morality. With Miss Caulfield taking off and putting on clothes at a great rate as an interesting model of what a staid professor should not be, it is hard to remember what the story of this film is all about. It doesn't seem to matter very much, however. 'The Petty Girl' may not make you ache with laughter but neither will it bore you—not all of the time, anyway."

Critic Philip K. Scheuer of the Los Angeles Times wrote: "As a farce with music in tasteful Technicolor, the picture comes off rather better than I expected; its comedy is often diverting, never painful and on one occasion hilarious. Mostly, though, you go through this with figures on your mind—and 'they' are usually Miss Caulfield's."
