= Jon Hul =

American pin-up artist

- Born: Jonathan Hul; May 30, 1957 (age 69); Pittsburgh, Pennsylvania, U.S.
- Education: Valley High School (Las Vegas), class of 1976
- Known for: Photorealistic pin-up art
- Style: Photorealism
- Website: www.jonhul.com

Jon Hul (born May 30, 1957) is an American pin-up artist known for his photorealistic paintings and drawings of models who have appeared in Playboy magazine.

== Biography ==
Born in Pittsburgh, Pennsylvania, and later grew up in California and Nevada. He attended Valley High School in Las Vegas, where he studied ceramics, oil painting, watercolors, and commercial design, graduating in 1976.

He is not a college graduate, and is mainly self-taught at his craft. He has noted as early influences the artists Salvador Dalí, Frank Frazetta, Alberto Vargas, M. C. Escher, Pablo Picasso, and later Patrick Nagel, Olivia De Berardinis and Hajime Sorayama.

In 1987, he decided to become a full-time artist, and to focus on fatherhood.

Many of his art pieces were rendered on different substrates, as he uses the media of watercolor, acrylic paint, oil paints, and pencil.

== Books ==
- The Art of Jon Hul (2003) (ISBN 0-86562-082-2)
- The Jon Hul Sketchbook Volume One (2006) (ISBN 0-86562-136-5)
- Jon Hul Gallery (2014) (ISBN 978-0-86562-235-7)
