= Harry C. Bradley (painter) =

American pin-up painter

Sitting Pretty, Harry C. Bradley, 1943

Harry C. Bradley was an American painter of pin-up art.

Not much is known about Bradley. He was a Philadelphia, Pennsylvania, based artist working in the 1940s and 1950s. He painted one of the most successful and enduring pin-up images of all time, Sitting Pretty, for Joseph C. Hoover and Sons of Philadelphia.

== See also ==
- Pin-up girl
- List of pin-up artists
