= Peter Pan Bus Lines =

American intercity bus operator

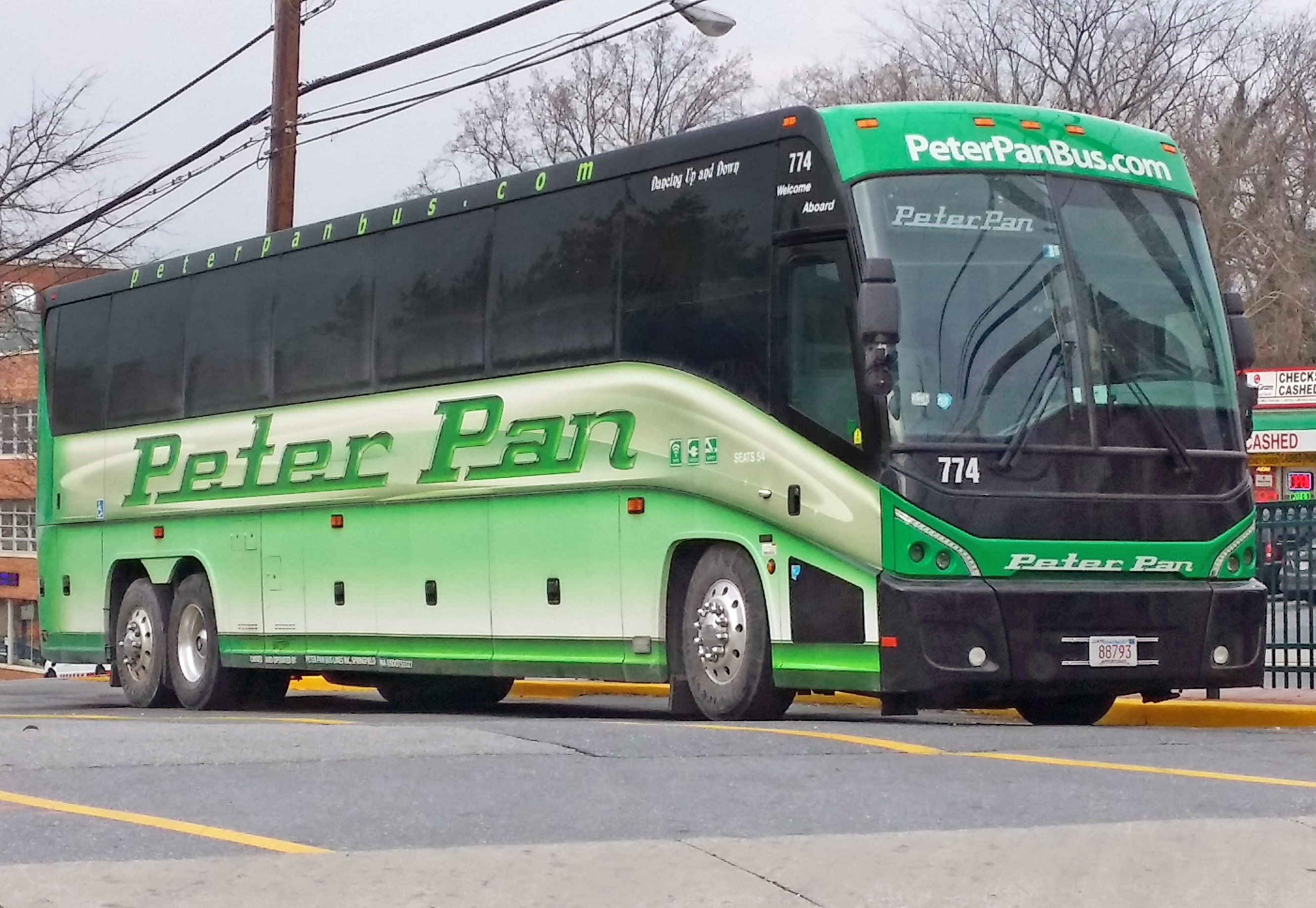
- A Peter Pan MCI J4500, photographed in Silver Spring, Maryland.
- Founded: 1933; 93 years ago
- Headquarters: Springfield Union Station; Springfield, Massachusetts
- Locale: Northeastern United States
- Service area: Northeastern United States
- Service type: Intercity coach service; Bus charter
- Alliance: Megabus
- Fleet: MCI D4505, MCI J4500
- Chief executive: Peter A. Picknelly
- Website: peterpanbus.com

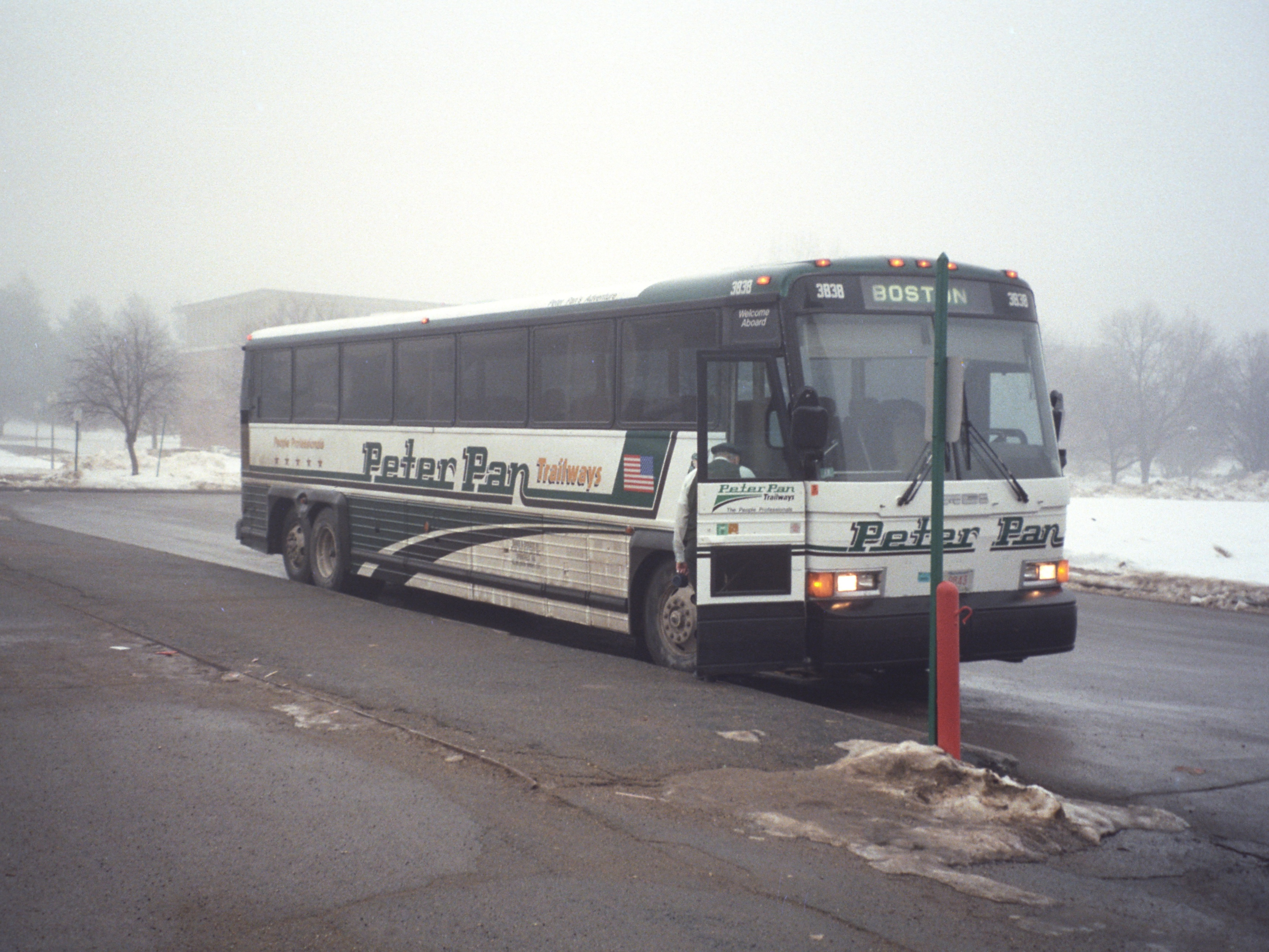
A now-retired MCI 102-A3 coach in Peter Pan/Trailways hybrid livery, 2003; the two companies maintained a partnership from the early 1990s through 2005.

Peter Pan Bus Lines operates an intercity bus service in the Northeastern United States. It is headquartered in Springfield, Massachusetts. It operates service to and from Connecticut, the District of Columbia, Massachusetts, Maryland, New Hampshire, New Jersey, New York, Pennsylvania, and Rhode Island.

The company logo is based on an illustration by Roy Best for the Peter Pan Picture Book. Since its founding in 1933, the company has been owned by the Picknelly family. Peter Pan's fleet consists mostly of buses manufactured by Motor Coach Industries.

== History ==
Peter Carmine Picknelly founded the company in 1933 with two Buick limousines and named it after his son's favorite storybook, Peter Pan. The company's first route operated between Northampton, Massachusetts and Boston through Stafford Springs, Connecticut, costing $1.75 and requiring nearly four hours of travel time. In 1957, the Massachusetts Turnpike was opened and travel time was cut in half. The son of the founder, Peter L. Picknelly, took over upon the death of the founder in 1964 and developed tour packages to the 1964 New York World's Fair.

Peter Pan Bus Lines was affiliated with Trailways Transportation System beginning in the 1990s, but ended that affiliation in 2005. A new partnership was announced May 2024 between Peter Pan Bus Lines and Trailways.

In 1999, an alliance was formed with Greyhound Lines, coordinating schedules, marketing, and ticket sales. Peter Pan and Greyhound had been bitter rivals for most of the 1990s, when Peter Pan expanded outside New England to serve New York City, Washington, D. C., Philadelphia and Baltimore. This partnership was dissolved in 2017.

In December 2002, Peter Pan acquired Coach USA's Northeastern division with 255 vehicles. In 2004, Peter Pan sold the Maine Line operation in Portland to Cyr Bus Line. The same year, Peter A. Picknelly III took over as CEO after the death of his father. In 2005, Peter Pan closed its Pawtuxet Valley, Rhode Island operations. On August 15, 2024, Peter Pan Bus Lines and MegaBus announced a partnership that will result in Peter Pan taking over all the Megabus routes in the northeast and mid-Atlantic states.

In 2023, the city of Springfield honored Peter Pan Bus Lines for its 90th anniversary, giving Peter Picknelly a key to the city.

In 2025, they became the first US bus company to eliminate booking fees.

== Controversies ==
CEO Peter A. Picknelly III has made political contributions aimed at dissuading the development of high-speed railroads in Massachusetts.

== See also ==
- Intercity bus service in the United States
