= Joseph F. DeMartini =

American watercolor artist (1927–2019)

Joseph F. DeMartini (February 13, 1927 – November 9, 2019) was an American watercolor artist, who painted pin-up girls. He was born and raised in San Francisco, California. DeMartini was a friend and contemporary of famed Alberto Vargas. He mentored several artists, including Ted Kimer, a watercolor pin-up artist. DeMartini was one of the last pin-up artists who did not use modern software to create and edit his works. Below is a personal statement by DeMartini:

"I was born in 1927 in San Francisco, California and began drawing and painting at an early age and attended the University of San Francisco. My earliest influence was the illustration of George Petty, but after seeing the works of Alberto Vargas in the 1940s, I discovered my calling in the art of pin-up illustration. I met Alberto Vargas in 1951 and began a close friendship that lasted until Vargas’ death in 1982. Over the years Vargas remained a source of inspiration for me. In the 1950s, I attended workshops with Thomas Leighton in San Francisco though I consider myself largely self-taught in the techniques of watercolor and airbrush. My work includes fashion illustration, calendar girls, and pin-ups. I maintain a studio in the San Francisco Bay Area and continue to draw and paint.

== Early life ==
During his early childhood, DeMartini suffered from polio starting at age 2. Doctors performed many operations on him, and he had to use casts, crutches and braces until he was 13 and could finally walk on his own. At the early age of 8, DeMartini was living in the Castro District of San Francisco when his mother gave him a pencil and paper, and told him “draw something,” to keep him busy while they had company over. This is when he started doodling and began his artistic journey. The artist grew up with Big Little Books, which depicted comic style pictures of characters such as Flash Gordon, and he would copy them. In 1940, Joe was coming home from school and saw a George Petty painting on a billboard of a beautiful girl holding a beer, and that's when he decided that he wanted to paint beautiful women. From then on, DeMartini practiced this by copying girls from calendars. Eventually, he learned to draw from memory.

== Career ==
Beyond his adolescence, DeMartini worked for a living in jobs such as clerk and messenger at Shopping News newspaper in San Francisco. Therefore, he had to work on his art during after hours. The artist first started working with colored pencils in 1946. He managed to sell 4 colored pencil and pastel works for $10 a piece. One of his bosses even bought one from him. Not long after, DeMartini started using models when his best friend's sister posed for him in several pictures. He continued working with colored pencils and pastels until he switched to watercolor and airbrush in the late 50s. He did his first complete watercolor painting in 1963, and went pure watercolor in the 70s. The core of his art career spanned from this time until the early 90s. Alberto Vargas was DeMartini's greatest influence in his work. However, according to DeMartini, Vargas never shared his artistic secrets with him contrary to what commentators have stated. While DeMartini considers himself Vargas's protégé, Vargas only contributed to his work by providing critiques.

Notable women sketched and painted by Joseph F. DeMartini include Marilyn Monroe, Kim Novak, and Rita Hayworth.

DeMartini has had several of his works sold through Heritage Auctions.

== DeMartini and Vargas ==
In 1951, DeMartini went to a hat shop in San Francisco, and there were 3 Alberto Vargas prints advertising the hats. He was impressed with Vargas's artwork and got in touch with him through Esquire magazine. They maintained a relationship with each other over the telephone until DeMartini took a plane for the first time to visit Vargas and his wife in Los Angeles in 1956. They remained friends all the way up until Vargas died in 1982.
