= Jacob Gestman Geradts =

Dutch painter

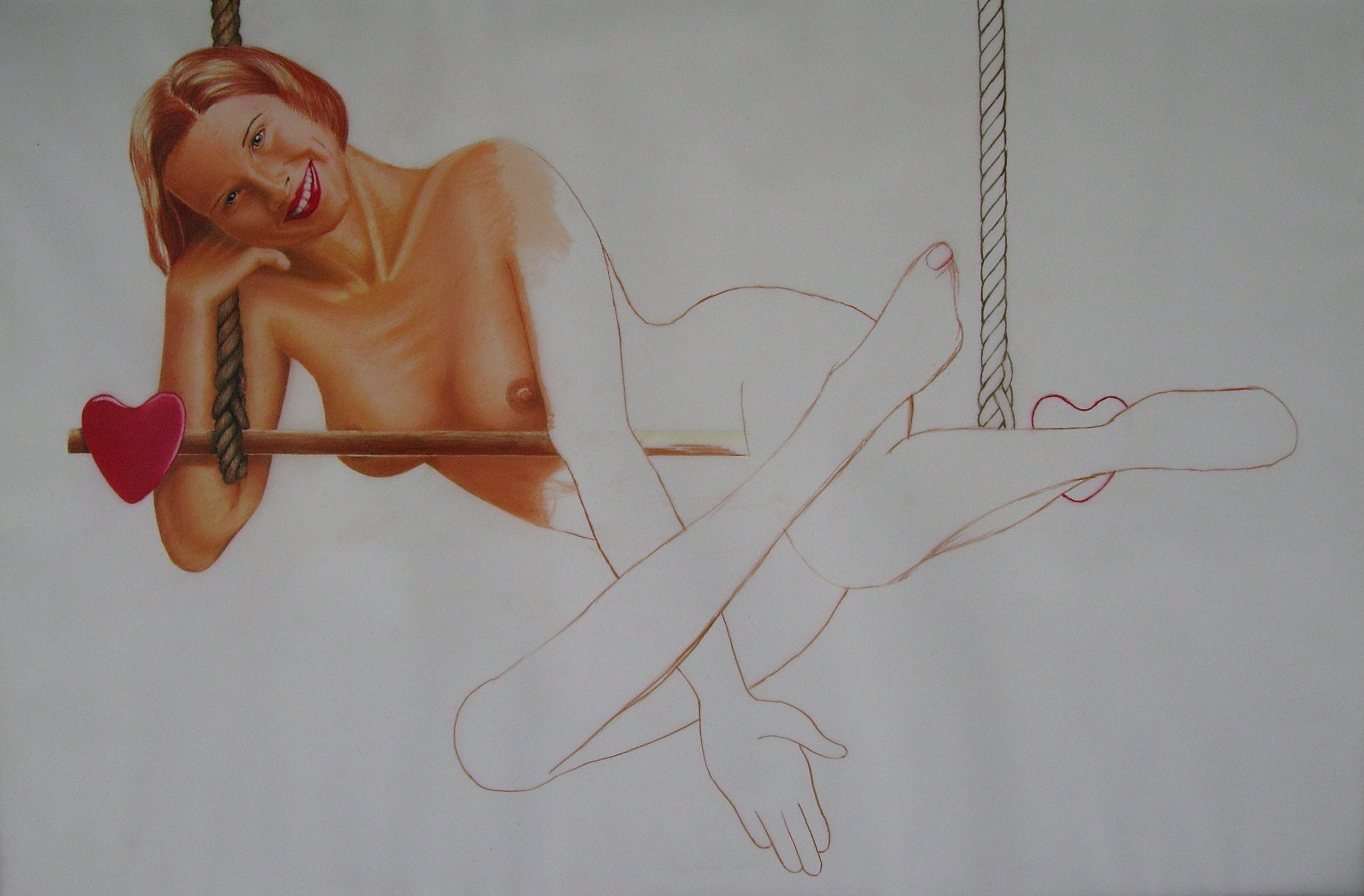
Trapeze by Jacob Gestman Geradts (1998) Color pencil on satinised polypropylene, 60 x 90 cm. J.G.G., Toulouse

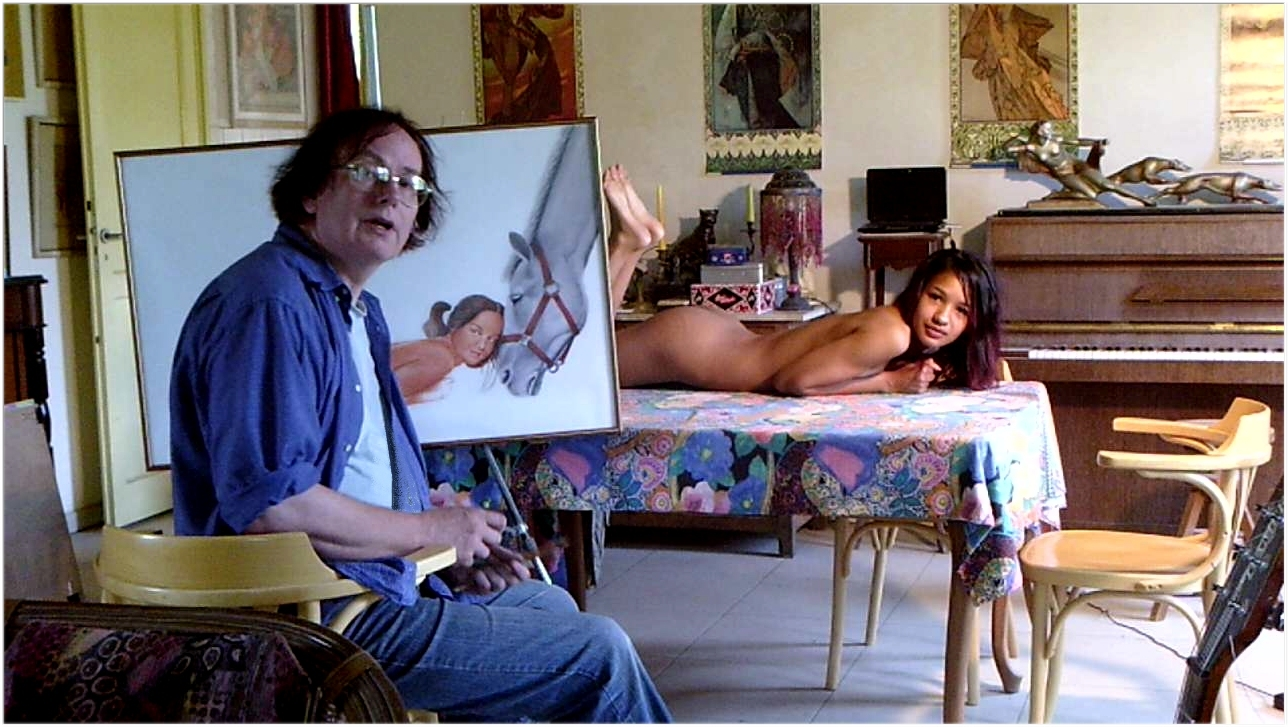
J.G.G. Jacob Gestman Geradts and model in his workshop (2016) Belleserre (FRANCE)

Jacob (or Jaap) Gestman Geradts (born 9 December 1951, The Hague) is a Dutch pin up artist painter.

== Biography ==
Geradts studied electronics at the Delft Technical University where he received his master's degree in 1977. He then became a professor on measurement and control systems as well as navigation and communication equipment from 1977 to 1987. He published hundreds of articles and several technical books.

In the late 1980s, just before moving to the south of France, he began drawing pin ups. First influenced by Alphonse Mucha, he soon modified his style in the way of the great pin up artists of the 1950s and 1960s, like Alberto Vargas, Aslan and George Petty. Unlike many other artists, Geradts uses color pencil instead of airbrush and instead of canvas or paper he uses sheets of satinised polypropylene.

From the early 1990s on Geradts started composing and performing post-pop music using the stage name Raticide.
