= Jessica Dougherty =

American artist

Jessica Dougherty (born 1975), is a modern pin-up artist, notable for being featured artist in a number of art and tattoo books and magazines.

There are several online pin-up galleries and blogs/publications showing and talking about Jessica's work and she has been featured in a number of group and solo shows in the Seattle area. She has also been involved in web and corporate work, including work for Eidos Interactive.
