= Morris Rudensky =

American criminal (1898–1988)

- Born: Macy Motle Friedman; August 16, 1898; New York City, U.S.
- Died: April 21, 1988 (aged 89); St. Paul, Minnesota, U.S.
- Conviction: Robbery
- Penalty: 10-to-life

Morris Rudensky (born Macy Motle Friedman; August 16, 1898 – April 21, 1988) was an American prohibition-era gangster, cat burglar and safe-cracker.

He became a well-known writer for an inmate-run magazine called The Atlantian while incarcerated at United States Penitentiary, Atlanta. Following his release from prison, he became a spokesman and security consultant for several companies, and wrote a memoir titled The Gonif.

== Early life and career ==
Born to a Jewish family on Manhattan's Lower East Side, Rudensky began his career by stealing bagels. At age 13 he was deemed incorrigible and sent to the Elmira State Reformatory. He escaped to make his way to Chicago where he cracked safes for the best price. He claimed to work for Al Capone's Chicago Outfit, Bugs Moran's North Side Mob, and The Purple Gang, a group of Jewish mobsters based in Detroit. He also traveled, cracking safes in Kansas City, St. Louis and San Francisco.

He later became known as an escape artist, successfully escaping from the Pontiac State Reformatory, where he was serving ten-years-to-life for the robbery of the Argo State Bank. Rudensky also claimed to be the mastermind behind the theft of $2.1 million in whiskey from a federal warehouse in Kansas City, Missouri, though no contemporaneous coverage confirms this claim. Rudensky continued to operate a well-organized theft ring in the Midwest robbing various payroll deliveries, distilleries, banks, and trains, and did freelance work for Egan's Rats and Al Capone.

At the age of twenty-one, Rudensky was again in prison, where he was known as "King of the Cons" for frequently getting into fights, and made several escape attempts successfully escaping briefly, after packing himself in a box being taken out of the prison print shop, but was soon caught.

He became friends with communist Earl Browder, in prison, who taught him English and encouraged him to write.

== Reform ==
During a prison uprising on August 1, 1929, Rudensky saved the life of inmate Charlie Ward, the future president of the Brown & Bigelow advertising firm. After befriending Ward, Rudensky became convinced to stop criminal activities, and after being transferred to United States Penitentiary, Atlanta Rudensky began to work on the prison newspaper, The Atlantian, later becoming its editor. In Atlanta he was the cellmate of Al Capone. Although Rudensky expected to serve as Capone's subordinate and errand-runner, Capone's failing health and Rudensky's position in the prison led to him acting as guardian to Capone in response to hostility from other inmates and corrections officers.

Shortly after the attack on Pearl Harbor, he wrote a popular essay for The Atlantian titled "Memorandum of Faith.” In the essay, he called on prisoners to support the United States and redouble their commitments to wartime production. He was later awarded a commendation by President Franklin Delano Roosevelt for his efforts along with Attorney General Francis Biddle.

In 1955, Rudensky was released from Illinois State Penitentiary, Menard on parole. He took a job as a copy editor from Brown & Bigelow, and later became chief consultant for the 3M Corporation Security Systems. In 1970, Rudensky published his autobiography The Gonif, which is Yiddish for thief. During the 1970s and 1980s, he lectured for a time visiting schools in the St. Paul and Minneapolis metro areas, including in the renowned Minnesota educator Dr. Ida Kugler's fifth-grade class at Hancock-Hamline Magnet School, trying to deter students from the life of crime he had followed. In 1975, he made a public appearance as Paul Eakins toured the country with a V-16 Cadillac once owned by Al Capone.

In his later years he formed the Red Rudensky Variety Show, a troupe that toured nursing homes, and he was a regular in the St. Paul Clown Club, entertaining in children's hospital wards.

Red lived in semi-retirement in the Sholom Home, a nursing home in St. Paul, Minnesota, until his death on April 21, 1988.
