= Nathaniel Milljour =

Canadian artist

- Known for: Painter, graphic artist, sculptor
- Movement: Figurative art, Lowbrow (art movement), gothic

Nathaniel Milljour is a self-taught Canadian artist, painter and sculptor from Calgary, Alberta, Canada.

Milljour's Artwork ranges far and wide in subject matter, from traditional architecture, to figures of incredible emotion, depth and color, as well as, more recently, digitally created vector imagery.

Often working under his company name, Studio Noire, his artwork has been featured on promotional materials and album artwork for musicians both Canadian and abroad. He has created promotional work for such varied genres as heavy metal bands Exodus of San Francisco, and Kreator of (Germany), as well as gothic icon and musician Voltaire of New York City, and Canadian Art Rock songstress, Sarah Slean.

His artwork has been featured on subculture gig posters for nightclubs and events across Western Canada, Toronto and in some parts of the US. He was one of the exhibited artists for the 'DECADEnce, a decade of gothic artwork' show in Vancouver in 2008.

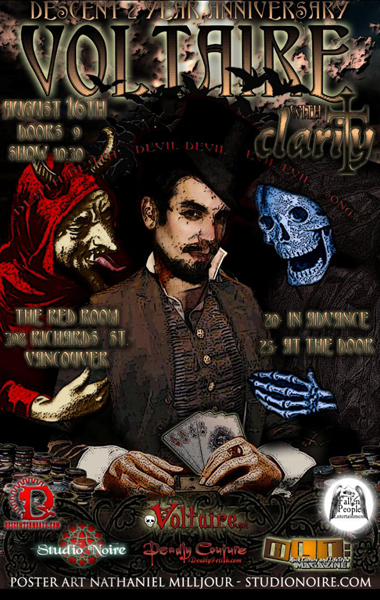
Studio Noire Poster for the Voltaire Vancouver Show 200

As of 2012, Milljour was one of the main contributors for the official Anne Rice fan club, The Anne Rice's 'Vampire Lestat Fan Club', based out of New Orleans. He is currently the main artist for the visuals of the Annual 'Vampire Lestat Ball'.

== Style ==
Artwork subject matter ranges from traditional architecture, to figures of emotion, depth and color. Often categorized into Lowbrow, he mainly uses Chiaroscuro, to create vivid Figurative images with somewhat of a Gothic, Erotic, and often Fetish flair.

His artwork was chosen in 2008 by Calgary Transit for their urban renewal program, "Art in Motion" where local artists works were chosen to help decorate unsightly utility boxes in downtown Calgary. His pieces, "Calgary in Green" and "Monoliths, both dark and foreboding surreal cityscapes of Calgary were chosen, and can be seen in both Eau Claire and on Center Street. In the summer of 2010, he was again commissioned by Calgary Transit for mural paintings on 16th Avenue North. Large scale pieces of his artwork can be seen on 16th Avenue and center street as well as decorating the walkway from 16th Avenue to SAIT Polytechnic.

His gig poster artwork is usually a staple in downtown Vancouver, predominantly on the heavily postered Granville Street.
