= Donald L. Rust =

American artist

- Born: 1932; Erie Pennsylvania
- Known for: Painting

D.L. "Rusty" Rust (born 1932) is an American artist. He was born in Erie, Pennsylvania. He is acclaimed among pin-up art collectors.

== Style ==
Primarily a realist, Rust's preferred medium is oil on canvas and his subjects range from wildlife, scenics, still-life, fantasy, portraits, pin-ups and nudes.

== Career ==
Early works concentrated on circus and portrait subjects, including such prominent individuals as Emmett Kelly, Merle Evans (Ringling band leader), and American painter Norman Rockwell.

Rust is a prolific Pin-up girl and glamour artist, with over 850 pin-up and nude oil paintings. Most of these are large, 30" x 24" sized paintings. His career has benefited from the current revival in pinup art, but he continues to paint a variety of subjects. "Men will always love girls," he says. "Being able to do a variety of subject matter keeps me from going insane."

Rust has produced more than 15,000 paintings, some of which hang in the John and Mable Ringling Museum of Art, and the National Portrait Gallery of the Smithsonian Institution.

Other work has included illustrations for books and magazines.
