= American Academy of Art College =

Private art school in Chicago, Illinois

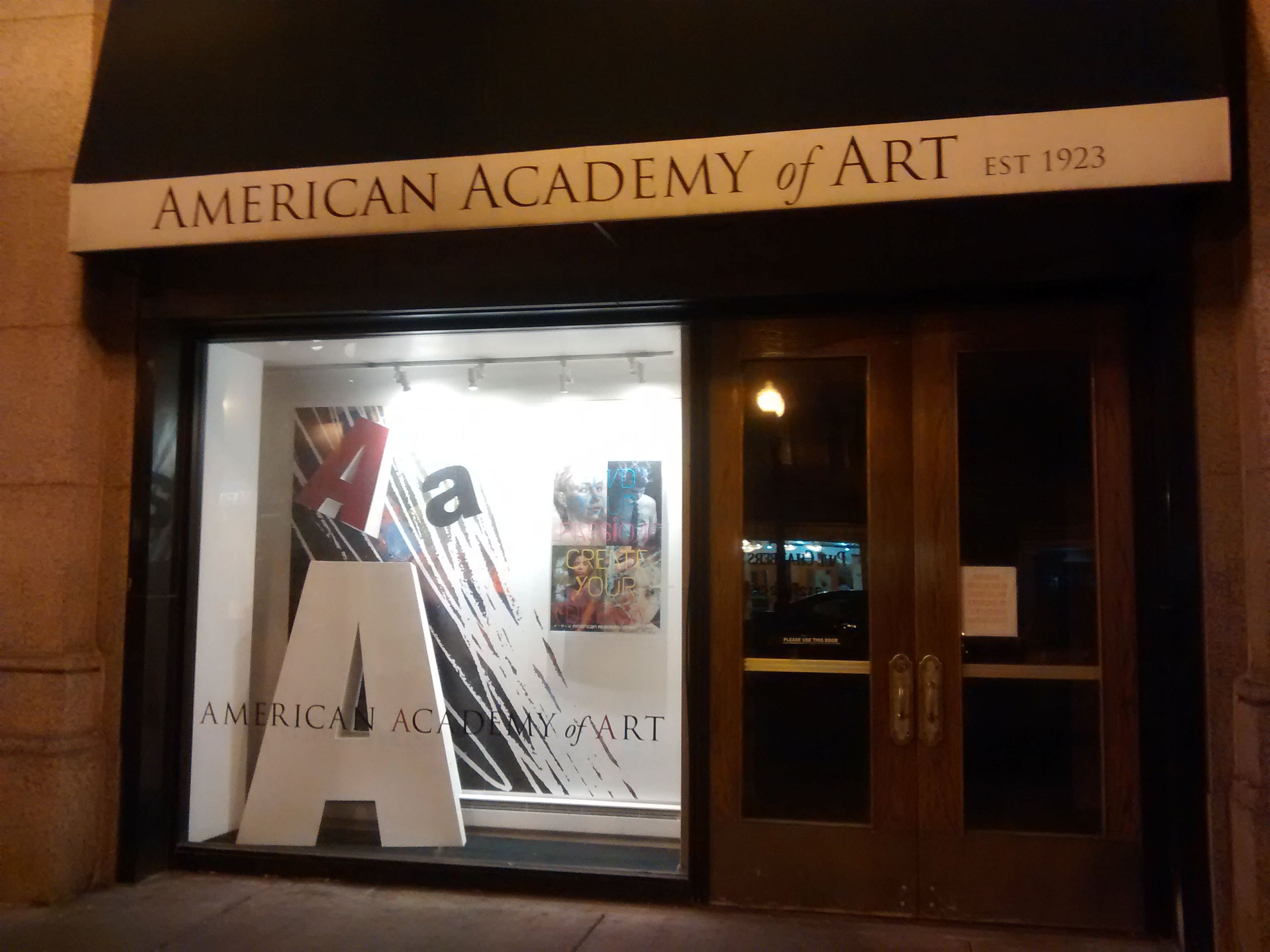
- Type: Private for-profit art school
- Active: 1923–2024
- President: Richard H. Otto
- Faculty: 21+ full time
- Students: 242
- Location: Chicago, Illinois, United States; 41°52′38.8″N 87°37′28.5″W
- Website: www.aaart.edu

The American Academy of Art College was a private for-profit art school in Chicago, Illinois. It was founded in 1923 for the education of fine and commercial arts students. In July 2024, the college announced its pending closure.

== History ==
The American Academy of Art was founded in 1923 by Frank Young and Harry L. Timmins to train students for careers in commercial and fine art.

== Academics ==
Enrollment was typically between 400 and 500 students. Eight areas of study were offered for a Bachelor of Fine Arts degree, all of which required 126 credit hours to graduate. The academy was accredited by the Higher Learning Commission.

== Notable alumni ==
- Joyce Ballantyne, illustrator
- Thomas Blackshear, illustrator
- Sandy Dvore, designer
- Gil Elvgren, illustrator
- George Hurrell, photographer
- Loren Long, author and illustrator
- Rupert Kinnard
- Alex Ross, comic book illustrator
- Richard Schmid, painter
- Richard Sloan, artist
- Daniel Sotomayor, political cartoonist (attended but did not graduate)
- Haddon Sundblom, illustrator
- Jill Thompson, author and illustrator
- John Tobias, game designer
- Kanye West, rapper (attended but did not graduate)
