= Joyce Ballantyne =

American painter

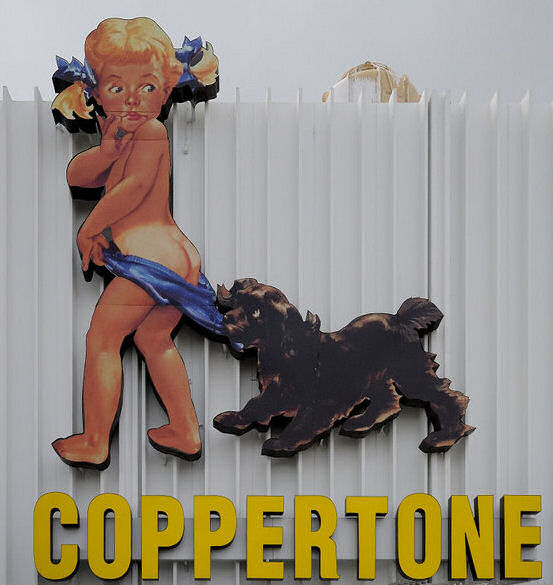
Coppertone girl sign

Joyce Ballantyne (April 4, 1918 – May 15, 2006) was a painter of pin-up art. She is best known as the designer of the Coppertone girl, whose swimming costume is being pulled down by a dog.

== Early life and career ==
She was born in Norfolk, Nebraska during World War I, and grew up in Omaha. She attended the University of Nebraska for two years and then transferred to the School of the Art Institute of Chicago to study commercial art and the American Academy of Art.

After two years at the Art Institute, Ballantyne joined Kling Studios, where she painted Rand McNally maps and illustrated books for Cameo Press. She then moved to the Stevens-Gross Studio, where she remained for more than a decade. While at the studio, she became part of a group of artists that included Gil Elvgren, Al Moore, and Al Buell.

== Pinup girls ==
In 1945 Ballantyne began painting pin-ups for Brown & Bigelow, having been recommended by Gil Elvgren. While there, she designed direct mail pin-up brochures for the company, and was eventually given the honor of creating an Artist's Sketch Pad twelve page calendar. She often used herself as a model. In 1954, Ballantyne painted twelve pin-ups for a calendar published by Shaw-Barton. Upon the calendar's release in 1955, demand was so great that the company reprinted it many times.

Ballantyne then went on to paint one of the most famous advertising images ever, when Coppertone suntan lotion asked her to create a billboard image in 1959. That image, of a pigtailed girl with her bathing suit being tugged down by a small dog, has become an American icon. Her 3-year-old daughter was used as the model for the girl.

== Portraits ==
Joyce Ballantyne eventually moved into the realm of portraits and fine art, painting the portraits of scores of entertainment and sports personalities as well as luminaries from the business, social, and academic worlds. Subjects included comedian Jonathan Winters, Robert Smalley of Hertz, and Major General John Leonard Hines.

She often resented the fact that the Coppertone girl was her most famous work, saying "Big deal, it's only baby art. I didn't feel there was anything special about that ad. Just a piece I was commissioned to do and nothing more."

In 1974, Ballantyne moved with her husband to Ocala, Florida where she lived until her death from a heart attack in 2006.

== See also ==
- Pin-up girl
- List of pinup artists
