= Al Buell =

American artist

Alfred Leslie Buell (1910–1996) was an American painter of pin-up art. He was born in Hiawatha, Kansas in 1910, and grew up in Cushing, Oklahoma. He attended some classes at the Art Institute of Chicago, which, in concert with a trip to New York City, decided him on a career in art.

In 1935, Buell and his wife moved to Chicago, Illinois, where he joined the Stevens/Hall/Biondi Studio. By 1940, he had opened his own studio. During this period, he did a number of pin-ups for the Gerlach-Barklow calendar company. Buell also did work for several other calendar companies in the early 1940s.

During World War II, Buell was rejected by the draft, so he spent the war painting a variety of popular and patriotic pin-ups for Brown & Bigelow. After the war was over, he began contributing to Esquire's Gallery of Glamour.

Buell returned to Brown & Bigelow in the late 1950s. He continued to paint glamour and pin-ups until about 1965, when he retired from commercial art. He remained active until he was injured in an accident in 1993, after which he remained in a nursing home until his death in 1996.

Buell produced two calendars for Brown & Bigelow, the first in 1960 titled "Al Buell's Delectabelles" and the other in 1961 called "Al Buell's Beauties."

== See also ==
- Pin-up girl
- List of pinup artists
