= Glamour photography =

Photography genre; subjects are portrayed in glamorous poses

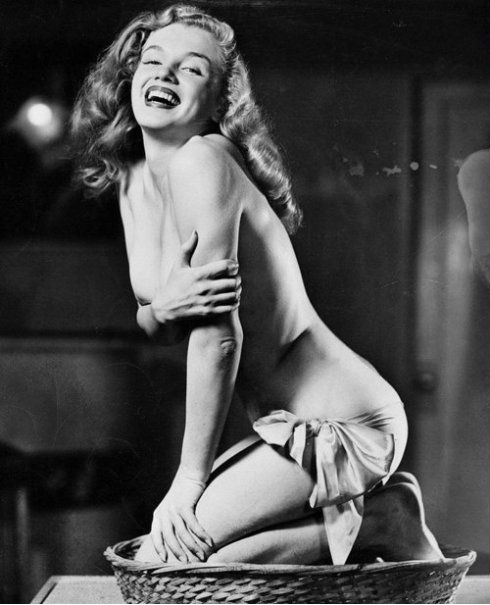
Marilyn Monroe photographed by Earl Moran c. 1950

Glamour photography is a genre of photography in which the subjects are portrayed in attractive poses ranging from fully clothed to nude, and often erotic. Photographers use a combination of cosmetics, lighting and airbrushing techniques to produce an appealing image of the subject. The focus lies in the beauty of the subject's body or portrait; as such, beauty standards are often a key determinant of glamour model trends. A popular subset of this type of photography is "pin-up" for women and "beefcake" for men.

Since glamour photography can include nudity, in such cases the distinction from softcore pornography is largely a matter of taste, although depictions of sexual contact are not considered within this genre and are considered pornographic. Glamour photography is generally a composed image of a subject in a still position. The subjects of glamour photography for professional use are often professional models, and the photographs are normally intended for commercial use, including mass-produced calendars, pinups and men's magazines such as Maxim; but amateur subjects are also sometimes used, and sometimes the photographs are intended for private and personal use only.

== History ==
Until the latter half of the 20th century glamour photography was usually referred to as erotic photography. Early erotic photography was often associated with "French postcards", small postcard sized images, that were sold by street vendors in France. In the early 1900s the pinup became popular and depicted scantily dressed women, often in a playful pose, seemingly surprised or startled by the viewer. The subject would usually have an expression of delight which seemed to invite the viewer to come and play. During World War II, pin-up pictures of scantily clad movie stars were extremely popular among American servicemen. Betty Grable was one of the most famous pin-up models of all time; her pinup in a bathing suit was extremely popular with World War II soldiers.

In December 1953, Marilyn Monroe was featured in the first issue of Playboy magazine. Bettie Page was the Playboy Playmate of the Month in January 1955. Playboy was the first magazine featuring nude erotic photography to receive mainstream attention. Penthouse was the second such magazine to achieve this.

Glamour models popular in the early 1990s included Hope Talmons and Dita Von Teese and the modern era is represented in the U.S. by models like Heidi Van Horne and Bernie Dexter, while leading representatives of the genre in the UK have included Katie Price and Lucy Pinder.

== Magazines and movie stars ==
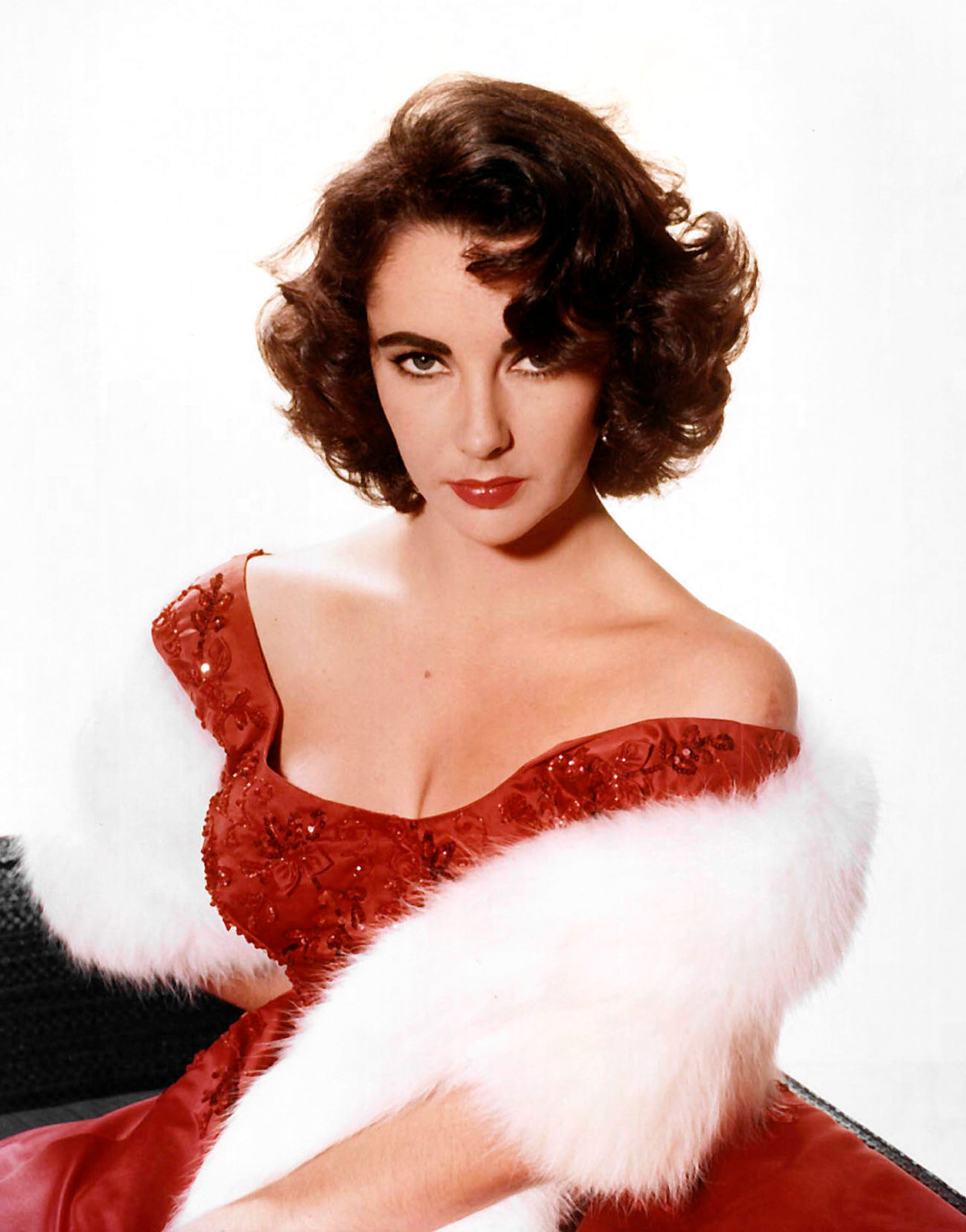
Publicity portrait of Elizabeth Taylor from c. 1955

Standards and styles of glamour photography change over time, reflecting for example changes in social acceptance and taste. In the early 1920s, United States photographers like Ruth Harriet Louise and George Hurrell photographed celebrities to glamorize their stature by utilizing lighting techniques to develop dramatic effects.

== Popular portraiture ==
Since the 1990s and especially in the 2010s, glamour photography has increased in popularity among the public. In more formal settings, glamour portrait studios have opened, offering professional hair and makeup artists and professional retouching to allow the general public to have the "model" experience. These sometimes include boudoir portraits but are more commonly used by professionals and high school seniors who want to look their best for their portraits.

As photography has become widely adopted through the use of smartphones, glamour photography has become a popular type of content featured on social media, particularly on Instagram. Instagram models and influencers posting glamour photography-type content have attracted heavy scrutiny from the general public, and are blamed for contributing to rising rates of depression and anxiety in the West.

== Gallery ==
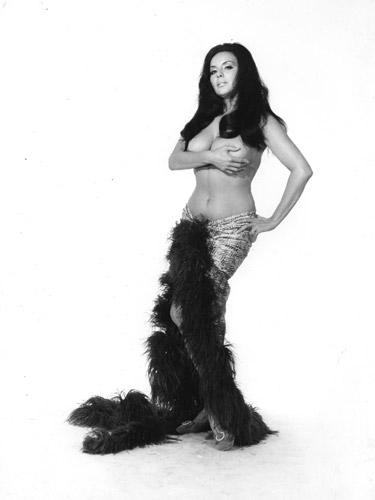
Isabel Sarli using the handbra technique, c. 1973

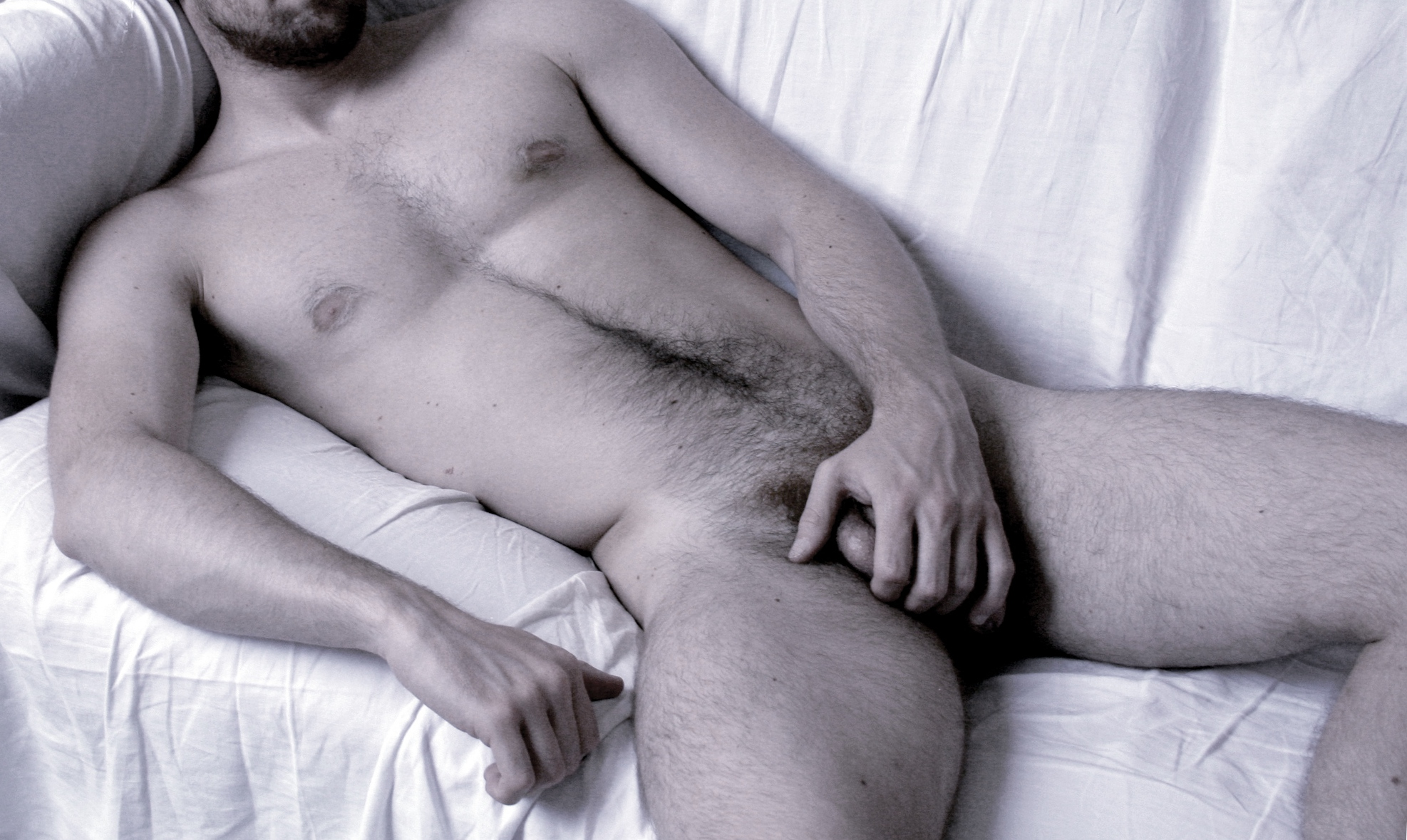
Nude male model using the masculine equivalent of the handbra, 2009

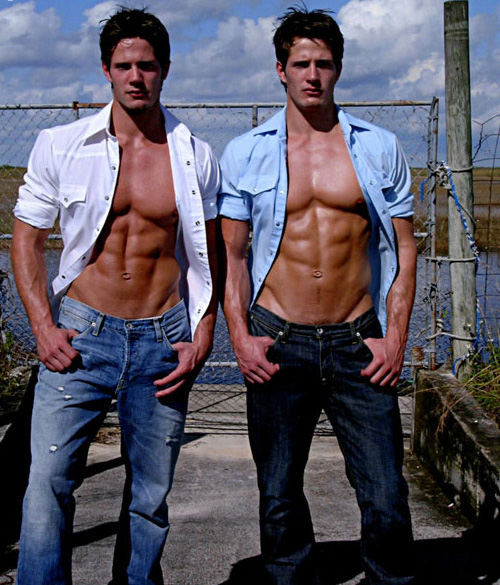
Carlson twins at a photoshoot, 2006

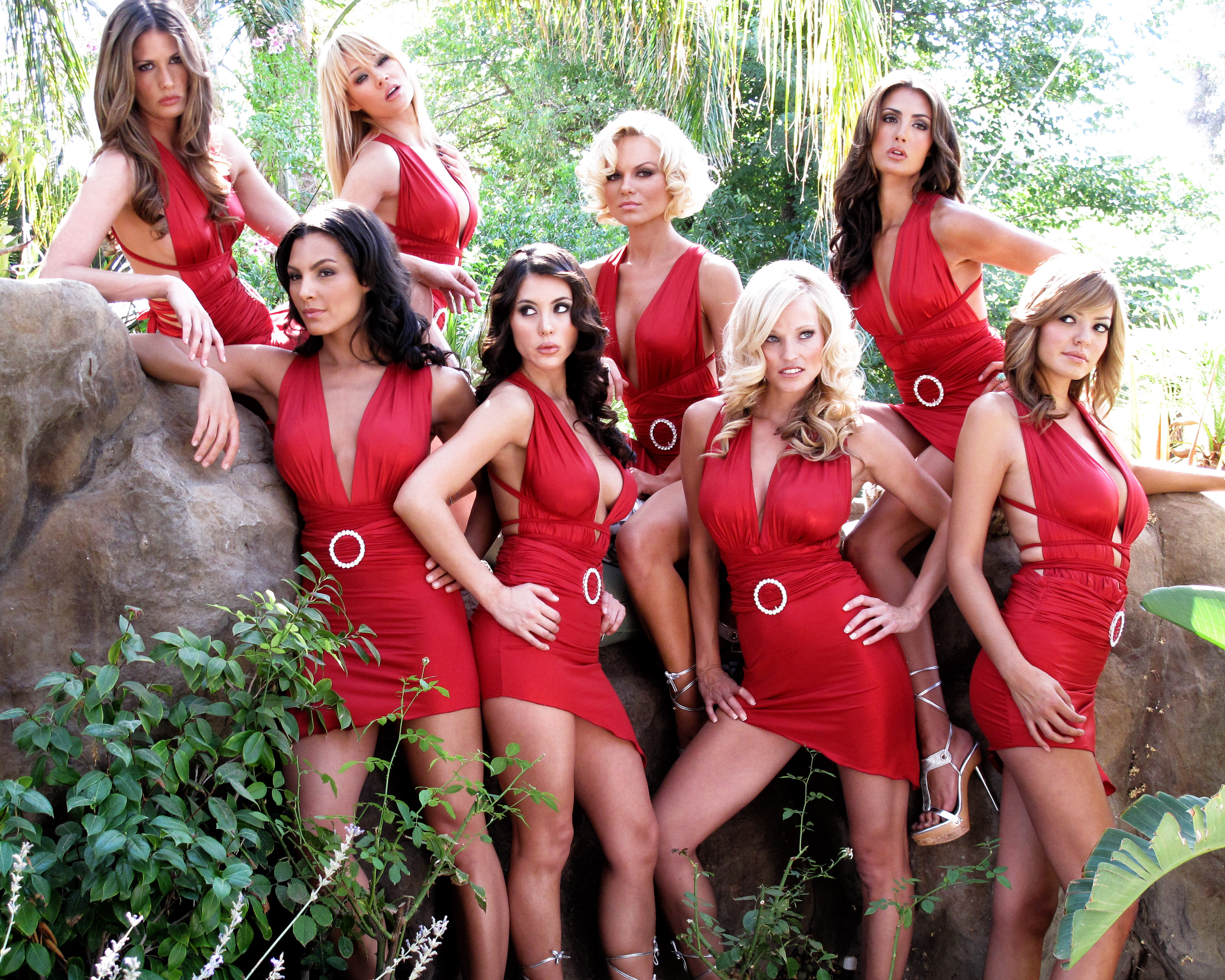
Models posing for a magazine cover, 2008

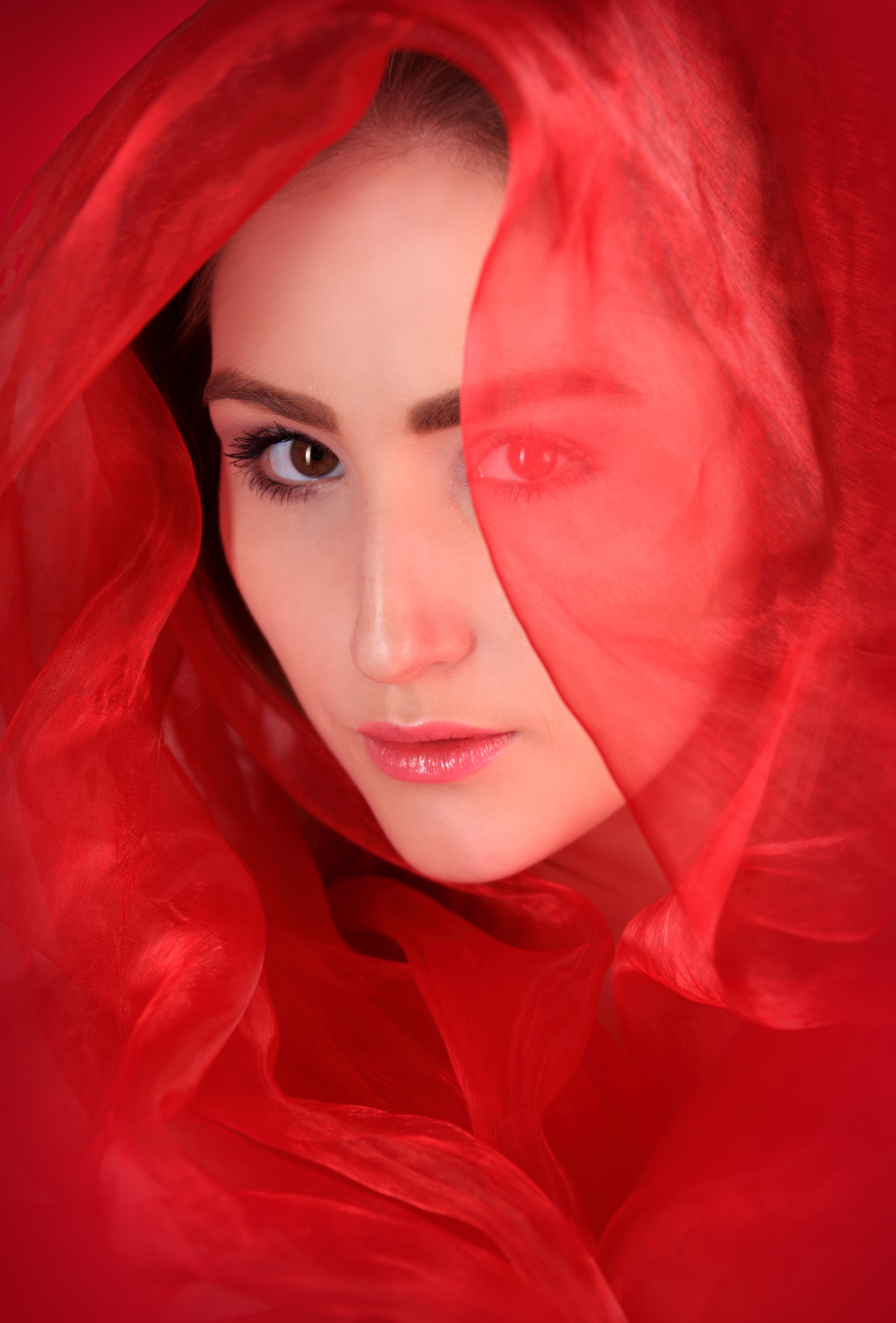
Woman posing with a red veil, 2014

== See also ==
- Erotic photography
- Erotic photography model
- Fashion photography
- Gravure model
- List of glamour models
