= Earl Moran =

American pin-up and glamour artist (1893–1984)

- Born: Earl Steffa Moran; December 8, 1893; Belle Plaine, Iowa, U.S.
- Died: January 17, 1984 (aged 90); Santa Monica, California, U.S.
- Education: Art Students League
- Children: Peggy Moran

Earl Steffa Moran (December 8, 1893 – January 17, 1984) was an American pin-up photographer and glamour artist.

== Background ==
Moran was born in December 1893 on Belle Plaine, Iowa, United States.

His first instruction in art came under the direction of John Stich, an elderly German artist who also taught the great illustrator W.H.D. Koerner. Moran also studied with Walter Biggs at the Chicago Art Institute.

Moran later studied at the famed Art Students League in Manhattan, where he learned from the muralists Vincent Drumond, Robert Henri, Thomas Fogarty (Norman Rockwell's teacher), and the legendary anatomist George Bridgman. After moving back to Chicago in 1931 and opening a small studio where he specialized in photography and illustration, he sent some paintings of bikini-clad girls to two calendar companies; when both Brown & Bigelow and Thomas D. Murphy Company bought the work, his career was officially launched.

== Career ==
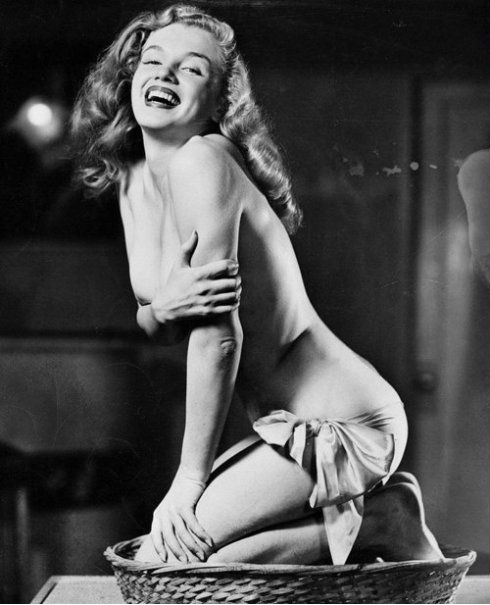
Marilyn Monroe posed for Moran through the late 1940s and early 1950s

Moran signed an exclusive contract with Brown & Bigelow in 1932 and by 1937, his pinups had sold millions of calendars for the company. In 1940, Life ran a feature article entitled "Speaking of Pictures" which mostly focused on Moran's work and made him a national celebrity. In 1941, Moran helped the magazine publisher, Robert Harrison, to launch a new men's magazine called Beauty Parade, and he later contributed pin-ups to other Harrison magazines such as Flirt, Wink and Giggles.

In 1946, Moran moved to Hollywood though he had already painted many movie stars including Betty Grable, for publicity posters. Soon after his arrival, he interviewed a young starlet named Norma Jeane Dougherty, later known as Marilyn Monroe, who wanted to model for him. For the next four years, Monroe posed for Moran and the two became friends. She always credited him with making her legs look better than they were as she felt they were too thin. Moran's work during this time period is now considered his most valuable; a Moran Marilyn pastel art piece sold for $83,650 at Heritage Auctions in February 2011, nearly doubling the previous record for one of his works.

Moran lived in the San Fernando Valley from 1951 to 1955, hosting large parties, directing and starring in short television films, painting portraits of Earl Carroll's Vanities Girls, and maintaining his position as a star of the pin-up world.

After a move to Las Vegas (circa 1955), Moran decided to devote his time to painting fine-art subjects, with nudes as his favorite theme. Signing with Aaron Brothers Galleries, he painted for collectors until 1982, when his eyesight failed. Some of his earlier works for Harrison were signed "Steffa" or "Black Smith". Moran died in Santa Monica, California, on January 17, 1984.

== Legacy ==
Moran's daughter by his first marriage, Marie, became a film actress in Hollywood in the 1940s under the name Peggy Moran. She retired fairly early to marry well-known Hollywood director Henry Koster.
