= Brown & Bigelow =

American publishing company

Coordinates: 44°56′29″N 93°4′28″W

- Founded: 1896; 130 years ago
- Country of origin: United States
- Headquarters location: 1355 Mendota Heights Road, Suite 290, Mendota Heights MN 55120
- Official website: www.brownandbigelow.com

Brown & Bigelow is a company based in Saint Paul, Minnesota, that sells branded apparel and promotional merchandise.

== History ==
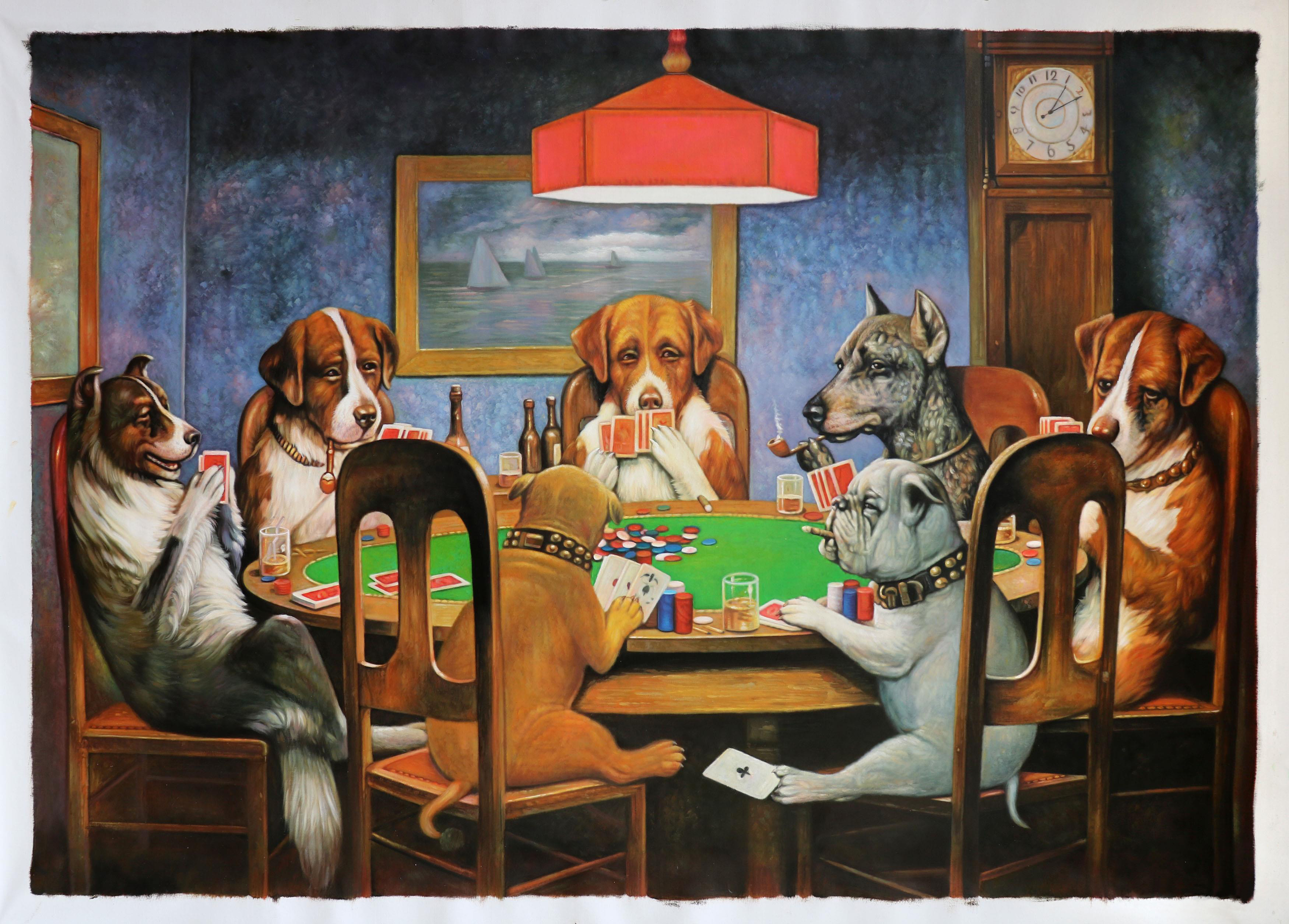
A Friend in Need, 1903, by C. M. Coolidge from his Dogs Playing Poker series

Beyond the Easel, Norman Rockwell's self-portrait with five Boy Scouts for Brown & Bigelow's 1969 Boy Scouts of America calendar

The company was founded in 1896 by Herbert Huse Bigelow and Hiram Brown.

On June 24, 1924, Bigelow was convicted for tax evasion, fined ten thousand dollars, and sentenced to three years in Leavenworth Penitentiary. He was released after eight months. While incarcerated, he befriended infamous safe-cracker Morris Rudensky.

On April 13, 1928, President Calvin Coolidge pardoned Bigelow. Following Bigelow's release, the company became notable for developing prototype convict rehabilitation programs through the hiring of hundreds of ex-convicts.

== Products ==
In 1925 Brown & Bigelow (B&B) inaugurated a tradition of publishing calendars for the Boy Scouts of America (BSA). The first was illustrated with a work by Norman Rockwell, which had previously published as the cover of The Red Cross Magazine. Rockwell was commissioned by the BSA and B&B to create an annual painting featured on each year's calendar; his works were featured from 1926 to 1976. He missed only two years early in the series.

In 1936 B&B's president Charlie Ward paid ten thousand dollars to artist Maxfield Parrish for exclusive rights to his work Peaceful Valley. By the late 1940s, the company was one of the largest printers of calendars in the world. It employed some of the best pin-up artists in the United States and sold calendars to an estimated fifty million homes.

Rockwell agreed to paint a self-portrait for the 1969 edition of the Boy Scouts of America calendar; it was a tribute to his seventy-fifth birthday.

The company has published artworks by Cassius Marcellus Coolidge (his sixteen-painting Dogs Playing Poker series), Rolf Armstrong, Gil Elvgren, Earl Moran, Vaughn Alden Bass, Mabel Rollins Harris, Douglass Crockwell, Emmett Watson, Norman Rockwell and Zoë Mozert.

At one point, Brown & Bigelow originally produced the Hoyle line of playing cards, in 1927. The Hoyle brand became so popular that the B&B group eventually printed all cards under the Hoyle name. All Hoyle brand playing cards (including the "Shell Back", Maverick, and Delta series cards) were acquired from B&B in a 2001 trade deal by the United States Playing Card Company.

== Gallery ==
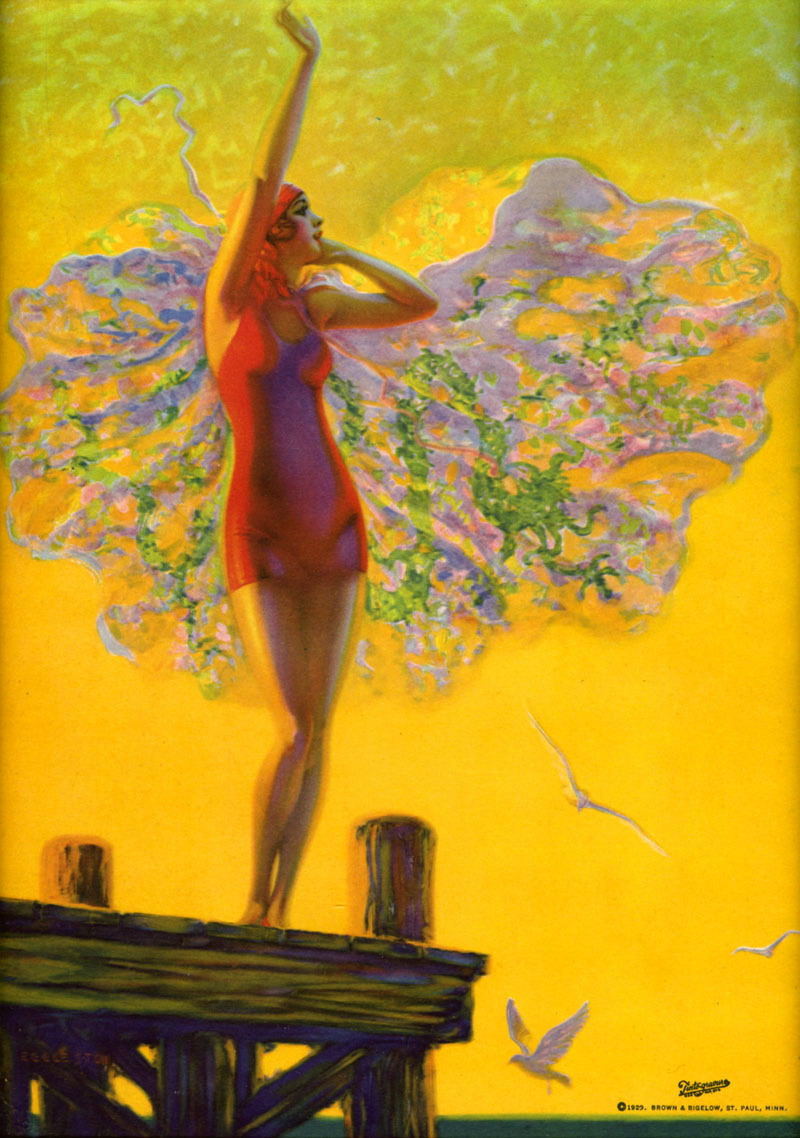
"Golden Glory" by Edward Mason Eggleston. 1929 Tintogravure print.

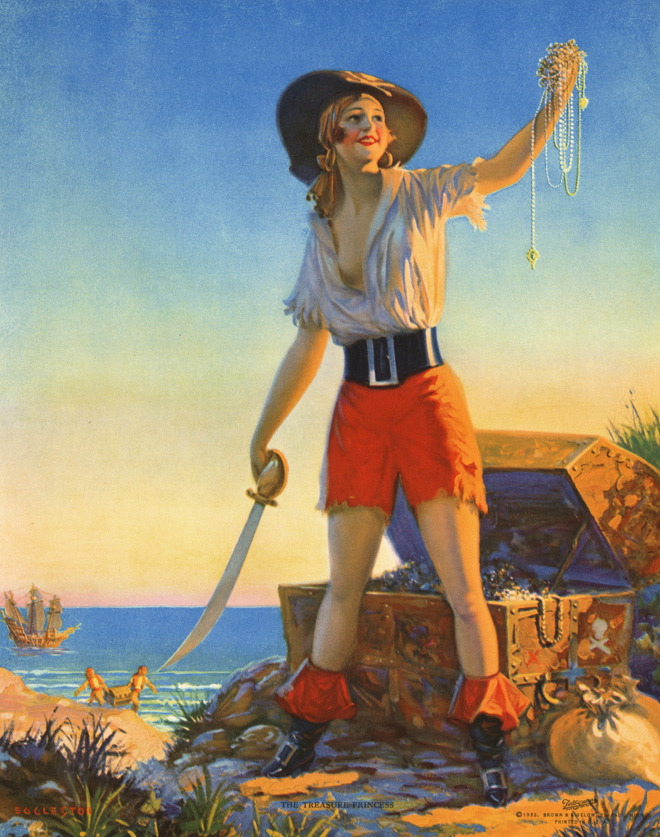
“The Treasure Princess” by Edward Mason Eggleston. 1932 Tintogravure print.

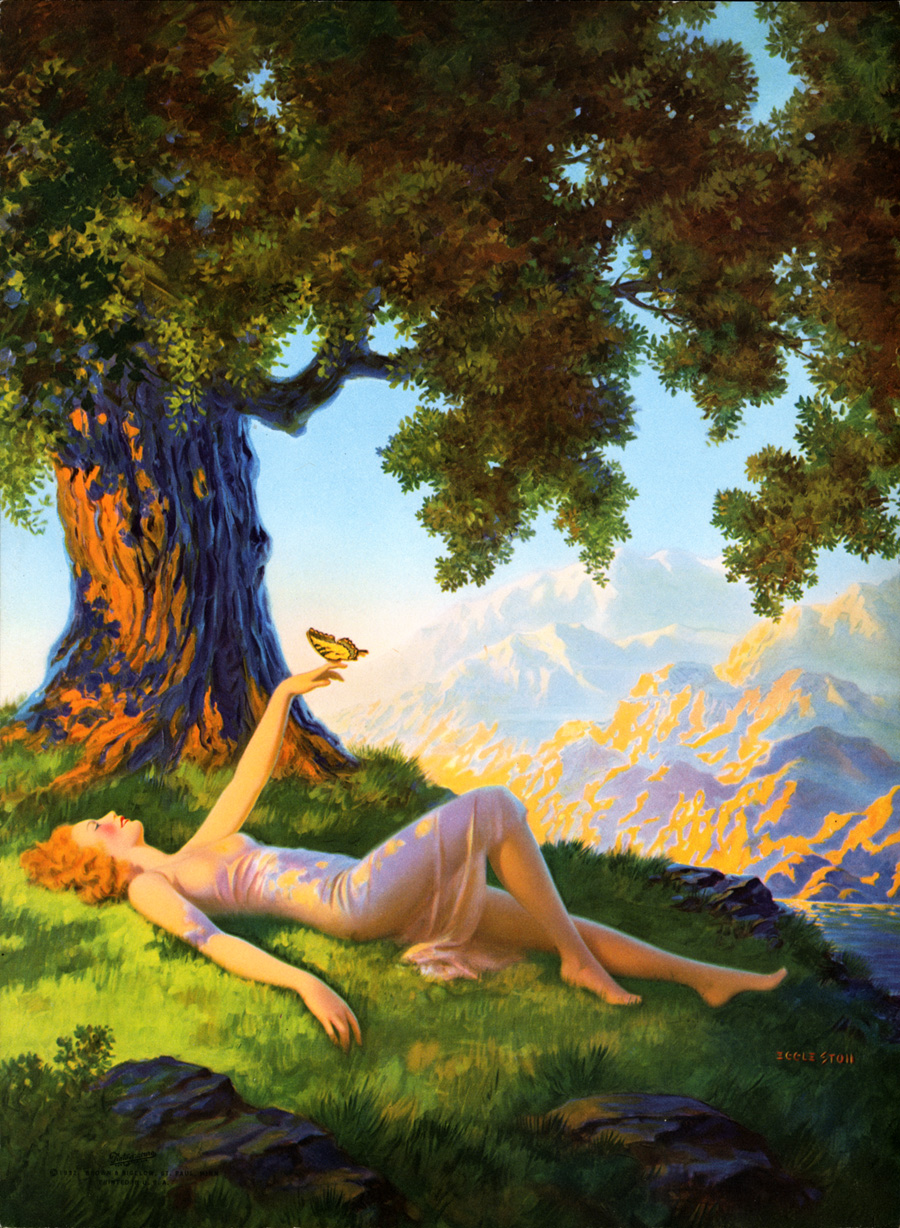
"A Day in June", by Edward Mason Eggleston. 1932 Tintogravure print.

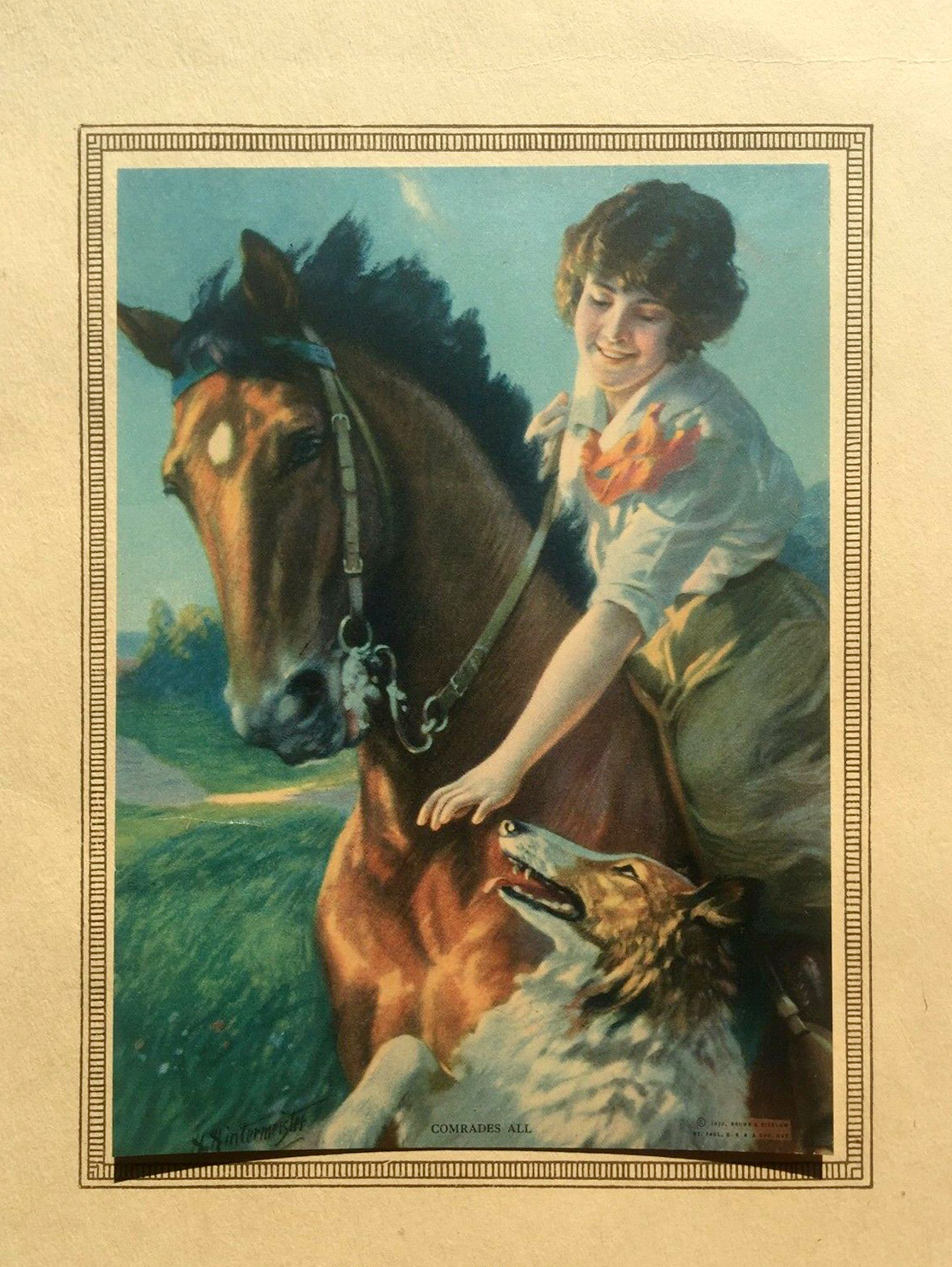
"Comrades All", by Henry Hintermeister or John Henry Hintermeister. From 1923 calendar.

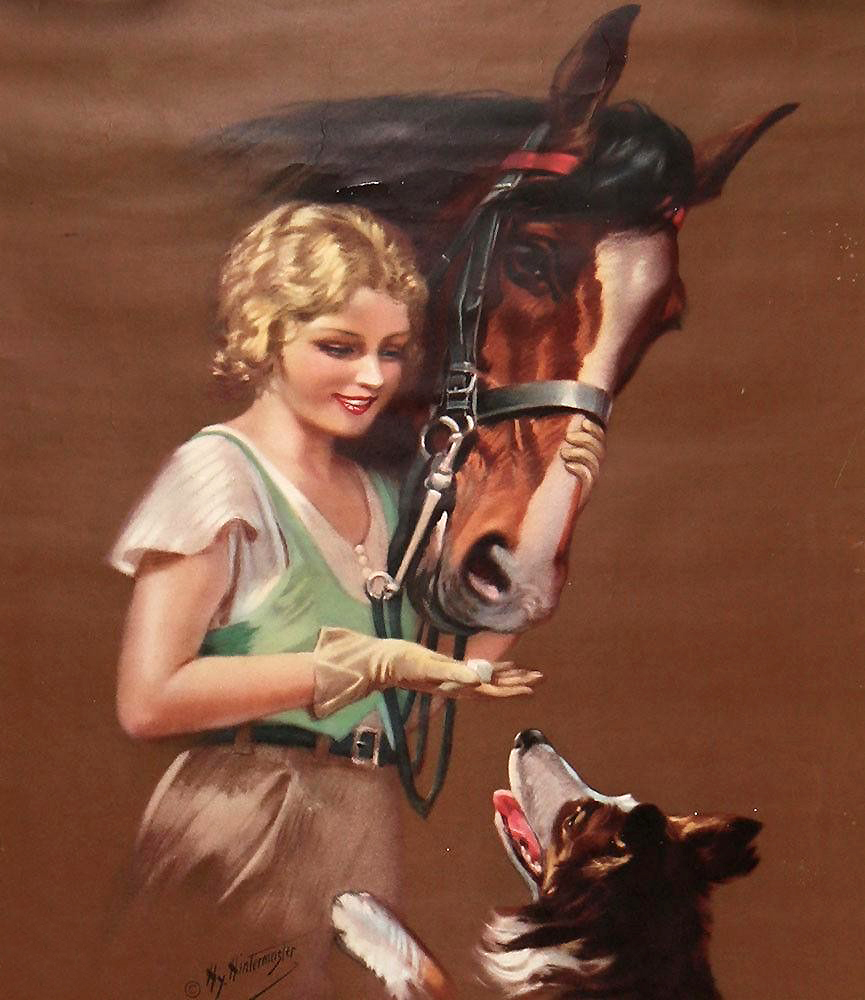
Thoroughbreds by Henry or John Henry Hintermeister.
