= Gil Elvgren =

American painter and illustrator

- Born: Gillette Alexander Elvgren; March 15, 1914; Saint Paul, Minnesota, U.S.
- Died: February 29, 1980 (aged 65); Florida, U.S.
- Education: American Academy of Art
- Years active: 1930s–1970s
- Known for: Pin-up art
- Spouse: Janet Cummins (m. 1933)
- Children: 3

Gillette Alexander Elvgren (March 15, 1914 – February 29, 1980) was an American painter of pin-up models, advertising and illustration. Best known for his pin-up paintings for Brown & Bigelow, Elvgren studied at the American Academy of Art. He was strongly influenced by the early "pretty girl" illustrators, such as Charles Dana Gibson, Andrew Loomis, and Howard Chandler Christy. Other influences included the Brandywine School founded by Howard Pyle.

== Biography ==
Elvgren was born in 1914 in St. Paul, Minnesota, where attended University High School. After graduation, he first studied at the Minneapolis Institute of Arts before transferring to the American Academy of Art in Chicago, graduating in 1936. Elvgren then joined the stable of artists at Stevens and Gross, Chicago's most prestigious advertising agency. He became a protégé of the artist Haddon Sundblom.

Fresh Lobster

In 1937, Gil began painting calendar pin-ups for Louis F. Dow, one of America's leading publishing companies, during which time he created about 60 works on 28 × 22 in canvas and distinguished them with a printed signature. Many of his pin-ups were reproduced as nose art on military aircraft during World War II. Circa 1944, Elvgren was approached by Brown and Bigelow, a firm that still dominates the field in producing calendars and advertising specialties. He was associated with Brown & Bigelow from 1945 to 1972. At Brown & Bigelow Elvgren began working with 30 inch x 24 inch canvases, a format that he would use for the next 30 years, and signed his work in cursive.

Elvgren was a commercial success. He lived in various locations, and was active from the 1930s to 1970s. In 1951 he began painting in a studio in his home, then in Winnetka, Illinois, using an assistant to set up lighting, build props and scenes, photograph sets, and prepare his paints. His clients ranged from Brown and Bigelow and Coca-Cola to General Electric and Sealy Mattress Company. During the 1940s and 1950s he illustrated stories for many magazines, such as The Saturday Evening Post and Good Housekeeping. Among the models Elvgren painted were Myrna Hansen, Donna Reed, Barbara Hale, Arlene Dahl, Lola Albright and Kim Novak.

== Personal life ==
In 1933, Elvgren married Janet Cummins, his high school sweetheart. They lived in Chicago before settling in Siesta Key, Florida, in 1940. They had three children together.

Elvgren died of cancer in Florida on February 29, 1980.

== See also ==
- List of pin-up artists
