= Rolf Armstrong =

American painter

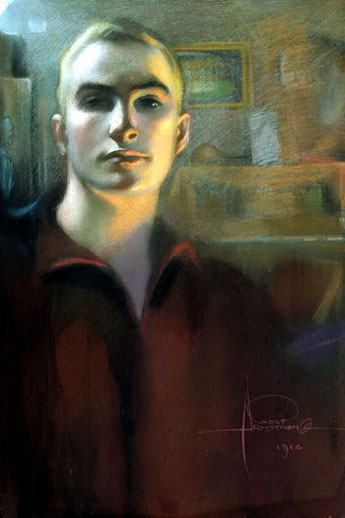
- Self portrait, 1914, pastel on board
- Born: John Scott Armstrong; April 21, 1889; Bay City, Michigan, United States
- Died: February 22, 1960 (aged 70); Oahu, Hawaii
- Education: Art Institute of Chicago
- Known for: Pin-up art, Illustrator, Glamour Art

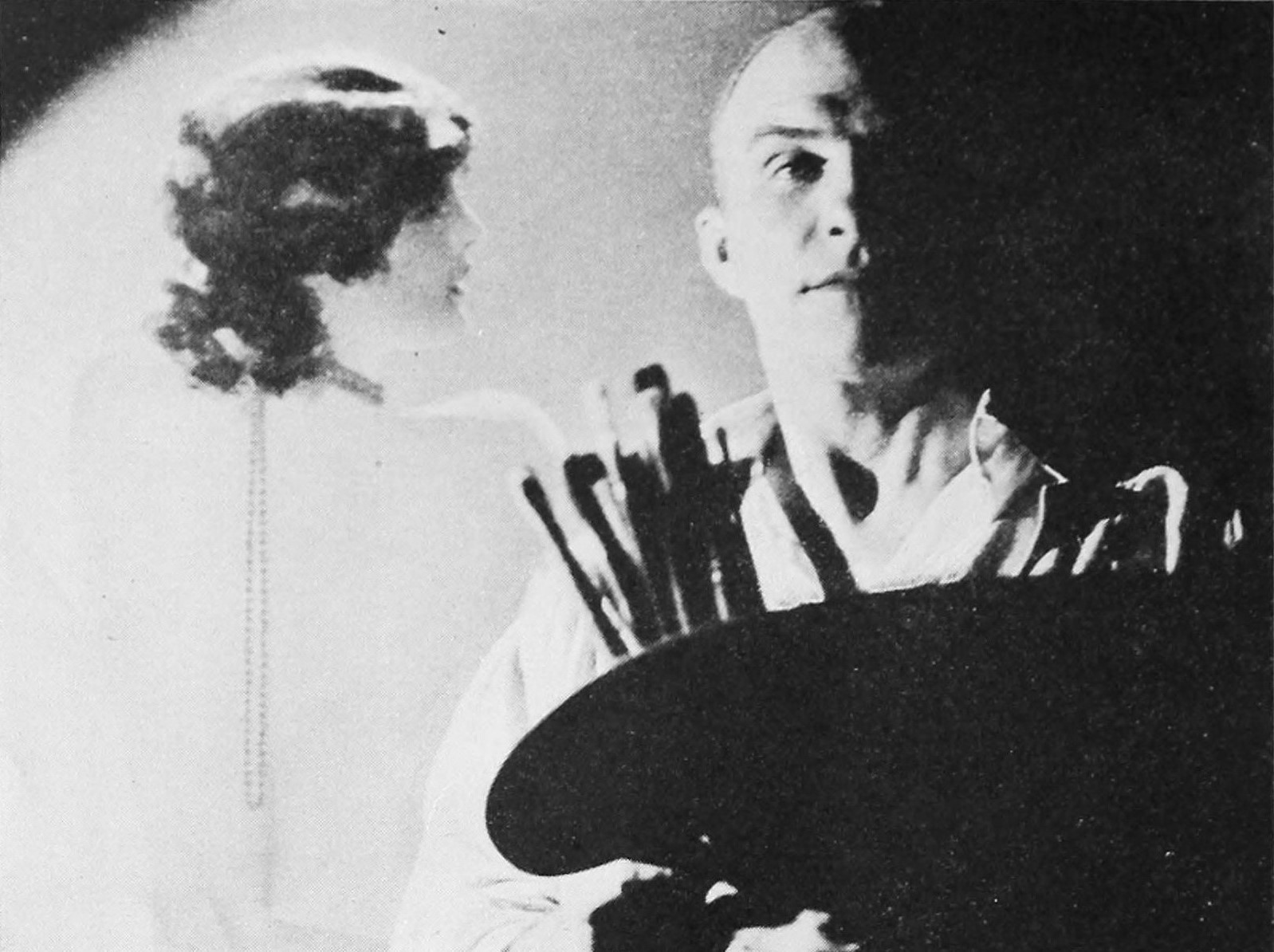
Armstrong in his studio, with one of his so-called "Armstrong Girls" in the background (1930)

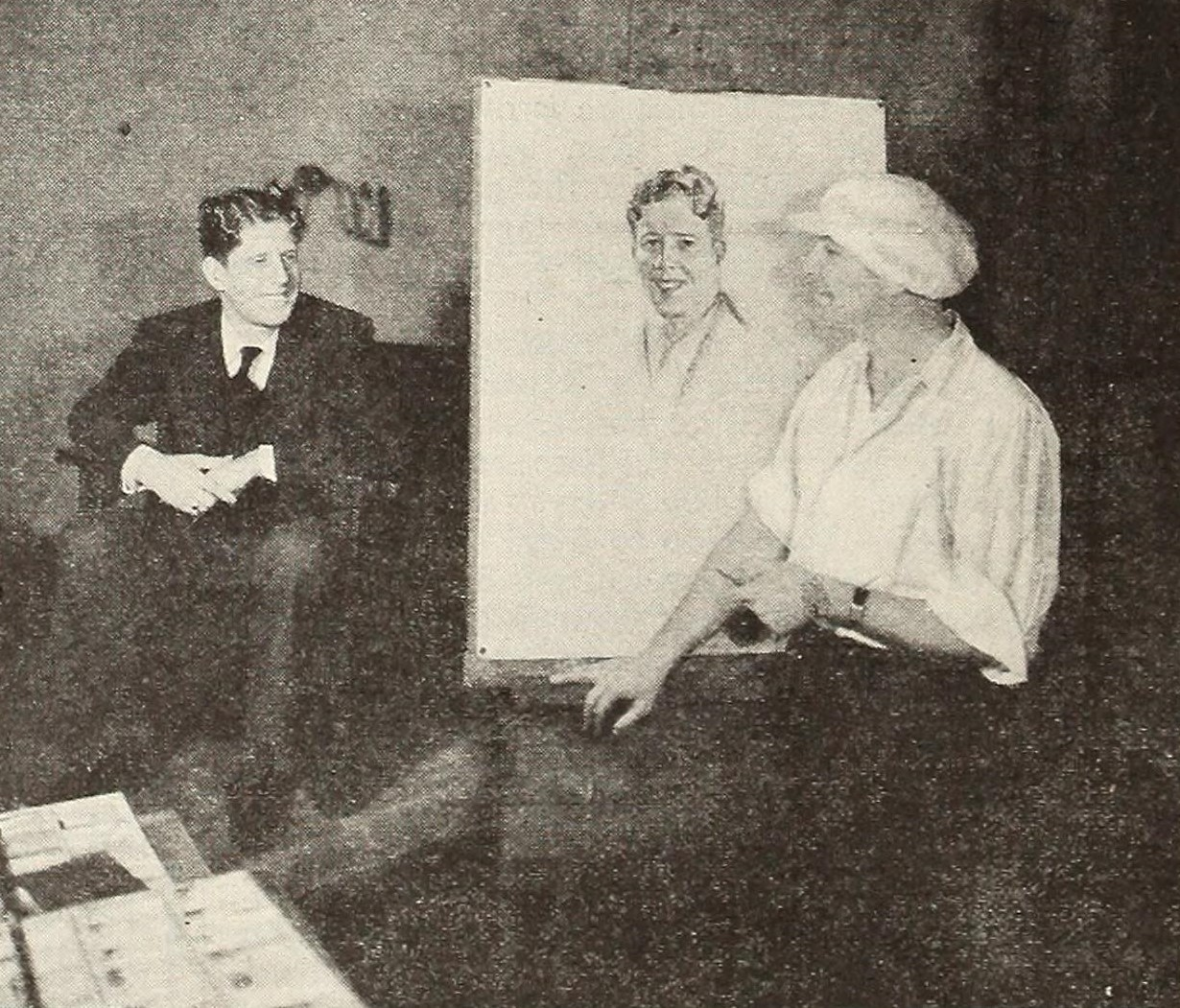
Armstrong in the process of painting Rudy Vallée (1929)

Rolf Armstrong (April 21, 1889 – February 22, 1960) was an American commercial artist specializing in glamorous depictions of female subjects. He is best known for his magazine covers and calendar art. In 1960, The New York Times dubbed him the "creator of the calendar girl". His commercial career extended from 1912 to 1960, with the great majority of his original work being done in pastel.

== Personal life ==
Rolf Armstrong was born John Scott Armstrong in Bay City, Michigan. His parents were Richard and Harriet (Scott) Armstrong. His father owned the Boy-Line and Fire Boat Company, comprising fire boats and passenger ships on the Great Lakes, including one that served the Chicago World's Fair in 1893. Due to increasing financial difficulties, the family left Bay City in 1899 and moved to Detroit, Michigan.

Rolf had two brothers and a sister, all at least 20 years older than himself. After his father's death in 1903, Rolf lived for about three years with his eldest brother, William, in Seattle, Washington. There, he became close to William's son, Robert Armstrong, who later achieved fame as a film and television actor best known for his role in King Kong (1933). Rolf's brother, Paul, also had a brief but successful career as a New York playwright (1907-1915).

After studying in Chicago and living and working in New York City for several years, Rolf married Claire Louise Frisbie, a freelance writer, in 1919. They had no children. Around 1930, they moved to Bayside, Queens, where Rolf had recently designed and built a house on an inlet of Little Neck Bay. Rolf had learned to sail as a child and kept as many as eight sailboats at this property. Among these was Mannequin, a decked sailing canoe he designed and raced, twice winning the American Canoe Association Elliott Trophy (1932, 1934). About 1935, Rolf and Louise left Bayside for Southern California in an apparent attempt to benefit from the movie industry. In 1939, they obtained a divorce, after which Louise immediately married Robert Armstrong.

In 1939, Armstrong moved back to Manhattan, taking up residence for the next 20 years in the Hotel des Artistes. In the 1950s, he traveled extensively, visiting Europe, Tahiti, and Hawaii. After several trips to the last, he retired there permanently in late 1959. Shortly after this move, he suffered a mild heart attack, followed by a fatal attack on February 22, 1960. In accordance with his wishes, his ashes were scattered from an overlook on Nuʻuanu Pali. In 1997, surviving friends and admirers arranged for placement of a grave marker at the Armstrong family plot in Elmwood Cemetery, Detroit, Michigan.

== Education ==
Rolf enrolled in the School of the Art Institute of Chicago in 1907 under the name Jack Armstrong. One of his four original roommates was Thomas Hart Benton, a noted painter and muralist. Armstrong moved to New York City immediately upon graduation in 1911 and lived for a time in the Lincoln Arcade, where he attended classes held by Robert Henri at the Henri School of Art. Around this time, he changed his name to Rolf.

Armstrong traveled to Paris in 1919 to study at the Académie Julian, and in 1921, he went to Minneapolis to study calendar production at Brown & Bigelow.

== Magazine covers ==
Armstrong's first known published work is the cover of Judge magazine from January 27, 1912, also known as A Live Wire. Throughout this decade, he built a reputation as a cover artist, producing over 60 covers for a variety of magazines, including Metropolitan, Puck, Every Week, American Magazine, and The Stewart Lever.

During the 1920s, Armstrong achieved considerable commercial success creating a total of 65 portraits of silent-screen actors (all but one female) for the covers of Photoplay, Screenland, and other movie fan magazines. Among his better-known subjects were Mary Pickford, Bebe Daniels, and Greta Garbo. As his popularity grew, he was the subject of featurettes in Photoplay and Screenland. Armstrong's work for the Pictorial Review was largely responsible for that magazine achieving a circulation of more than two million by 1926. His other published works in the 1920s include a cover for Collier's (1926) and two covers for the Saturday Evening Post (1923). In 1925, Armstrong contracted with the newly launched College Humor, a monthly magazine aimed at male college students, producing 68 covers over the following decade.

As color photography came into its own, demand for original cover art waned in the 1930s. Armstrong's last known cover image is College Humor, March 1936. The great majority of Armstrong's magazine covers show the head only, and of the roughly 200 known originals, most are relatively small works (less than 24 inches in greatest dimension).

== Calendar art ==
The earliest known calendar featuring an Armstrong image is from 1915. During the 1920s and early '30s, Armstrong's work appeared with increasing frequency as calendar art. These were often reused or reworked magazine cover images. One of the most popular of such images was "Hello Everybody", originally the March 1929 cover of College Humor. This was the first College Humor cover showing the entire figure, as opposed to the head only.

During this period, Armstrong also produced works specifically for the calendar industry. Notable exceptions to the small pastels typically done by Armstrong in this period were five life-sized oil paintings of the female figure entitled Cleopatra, the Enchantress, Arabian Nights, Carmen, and Song of India. All were published as calendar art, and since they never appeared as magazine covers, they were almost certainly created for this purpose.

Calendar images became a larger part of Armstrong's work in the early '30s and his chief source of income within a few years. In 1927, Armstrong was the best-selling calendar artist at Brown & Bigelow, and in 1933, the Thomas D. Murphy Calendar Company signed him to produce a series of paintings for their line. Around 1939, he landed a lucrative contract to produce exclusively for Brown & Bigelow, the largest calendar publisher at that time. Under this contract, which was renewed throughout the '40s and '50s, he produced around six original pieces per year (fewer in later years).

Most of Armstrong's later works produced for the calendar industry depict the entire figure, were done in pastel, and were of intermediate size (about 36 inches in greatest dimension). Approximately 180 calendar images are known, not including reworked cover images.

== Other work ==
Many, if not most, of Armstrong's covers and early calendar images were reused for sheet music, postcards, and all manner of advertising items. In addition, Armstrong produced at least another 60 original images for magazine or other advertisements, including a series for RCA around 1930. About the same number of unpublished sketches, student works, and portraits are known.

== Summary of work ==
Along with Howard Chandler Christy, Norman Rockwell, and numerous other artists, Armstrong lived and worked during what is called the Golden Age of American Illustration, which began with the development of four-color printing in the late 19th century, was fueled by the advent of magazines supported by advertising, and declined after the introduction of color photography in the 1930s.

In a career of almost 50 years, Rolf Armstrong produced over 500 works. He prided himself on the fact that he worked almost exclusively from live models, as opposed to photographic references. Armstrong eschewed the term "illustrator", instead referring to himself as a "portrayer of feminine beauty". The term "glamour" has been applied to his work retrospectively in an effort to distinguish his style from those of artists who may depict female subjects, but not in a glamorizing way. For the same reason, while the term "pin-up" is often applied to his work, its use is controversial among Armstrong enthusiasts.

In Pin Up Dreams: The Glamour Art of Rolf Armstrong, the authors present glamour art generally, and the work of Rolf Armstrong specifically, as characteristic of the early 20th century, especially the years 1920-1950 "after World War I had freed women of their excessive modesty, but before World War II had made certain subtleties seem outdated." The glamour girl as depicted by Armstrong is described as "beautiful of face and form...always vivacious and often mysterious, exuding romance and subtle sexuality."

In addition to societal attitudes toward women, Armstrong's work illustrates other many other aspects of American life in the early 20th century. These include trends in hairstyles and fashion, popular color schemes, changing concepts of ideal beauty, and cultural trends such as Egyptology (1920s), female participation in sports ('30s), patriotism ('40s), and Hawaiian and Western themes ('50s).

Armstrong's better-known images include Naomi a.k.a. Portrait of Martha Mansfield (1920), The Dream Girl (1924), The Bride Pompeiian Beauty Panel (1927), It (1927), Dreamy Eyes (1927), The Enchantress (1927), Queen of the Ball (1928), Hello Everybody (1929), Thinking of You (1930), Golden Girl (1933), How Am I Doing? (1940), On the Beam (1943), and Toast of the Town (1945).

== Work with Jewel Flowers ==
In March 1940, Jewel Flowers, a girl from Lumberton, North Carolina, sent a picture of herself to Armstrong in response to an advertisement he had placed in The New York Times. Armstrong, 50 at the time, had been based at the Hotel des Artistes on West 67th Street in Manhattan since 1939, and was seeking new models. He invited Flowers for an interview. On March 25, 1940, Flowers began modeling for Armstrong. Their professional collaboration and friendship lasted two decades. The first painting, titled How am I doing?, reportedly because Flowers, new to modeling, repeatedly asked Armstrong, "How am I doing?" during the session, was first published after World War II began. It was Brown & Bigelow's best selling calendar for 1942 at a time when the company sold millions of calendars in America. It became one of Armstrong's most reproduced pictures. Flowers was popular with American servicemen during World War II, some of whom sent her letters proposing marriage. Armstrong's calendars and silhouettes of Flowers were copied onto bombers and other planes as nose art and painted on tank turrets. She became so well-known during the war, although more as a famous face than by name, that a serviceman's letter addressed simply as "Jewel Flowers, New York City" was delivered correctly. For many American servicemen abroad, she represented the "Why We Fight" spirit. U.S. President Franklin D. Roosevelt's government enlisted her to help promote war bonds. The January 1, 1945, edition of TIME included Armstrong's Toast of the Town painting of Flowers in an article about calendar art. The article noted that calendars with "girl paintings" were "bought heavily by foundries, machine shops, [and] auto-supply dealers."

Flowers married in 1946. Her husband and she resided in several locations while he attempted several business ventures, including Laguna Beach, California, Greenville, South Carolina, and Reno, Nevada, where she reportedly worked as a card dealer, and New York City. According to Michael Wooldridge, coauthor of Pin up Dreams: The Glamour Art of Rolf Armstrong, Armstrong called her several times while she was following her husband's quest, attempting to persuade her to return to New York and model for him.

Her modeling career ended with Armstrong's death in 1960. He left a large proportion of his personal wealth to Flowers. Armstrong created roughly 50 to 60 works using Flowers as the model.

== Gallery ==
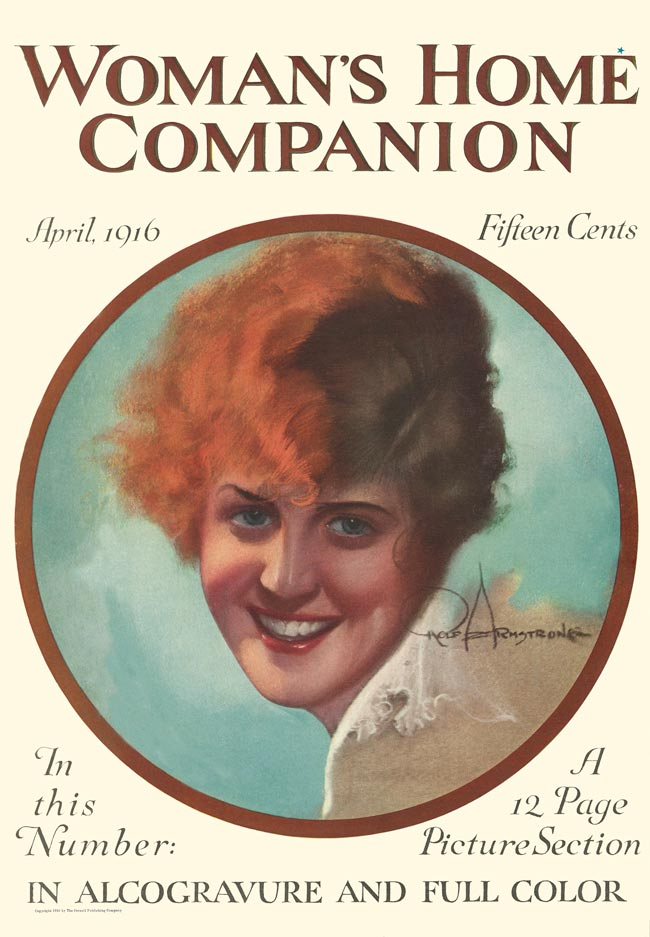
Woman's Home Companion, April 1916

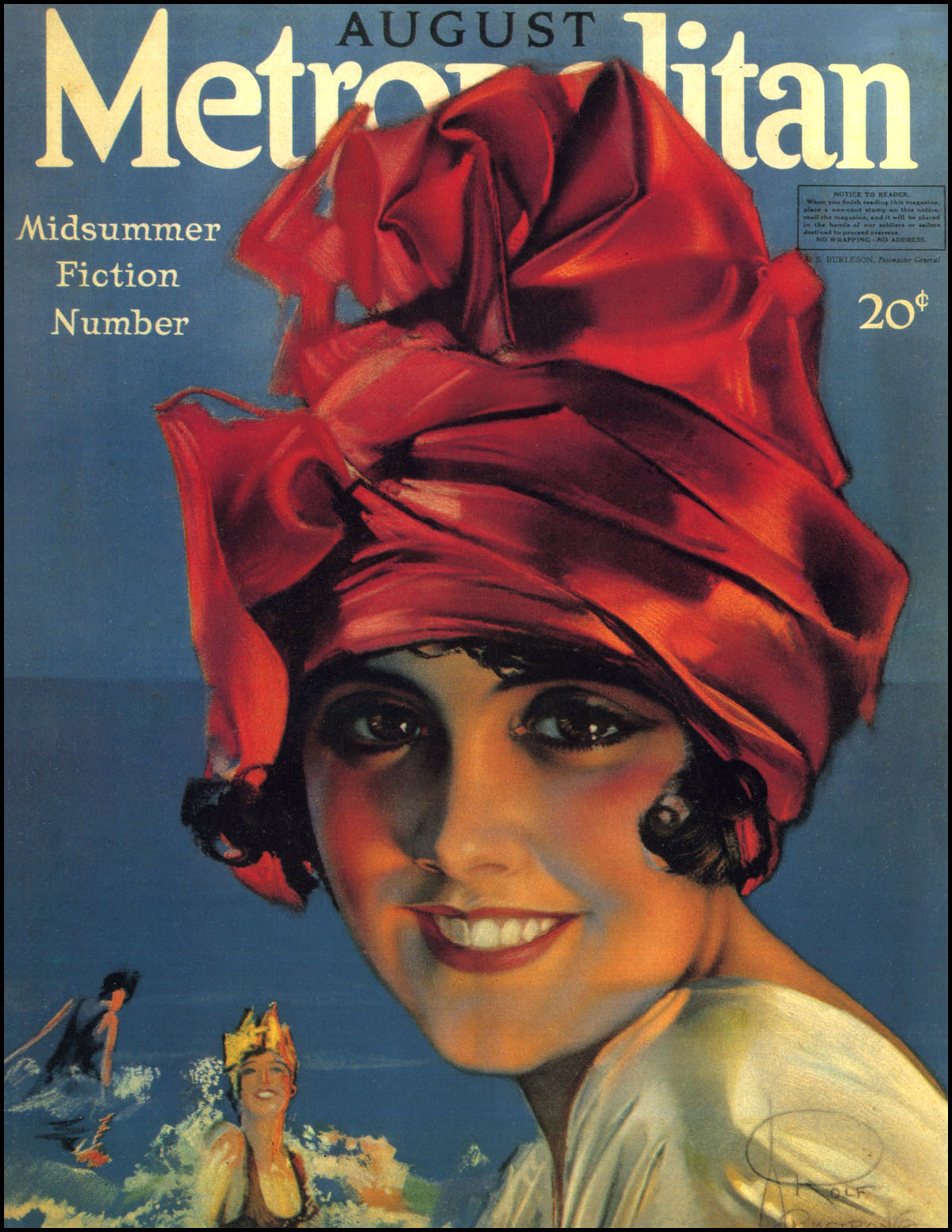
Metropolitan, August 1918

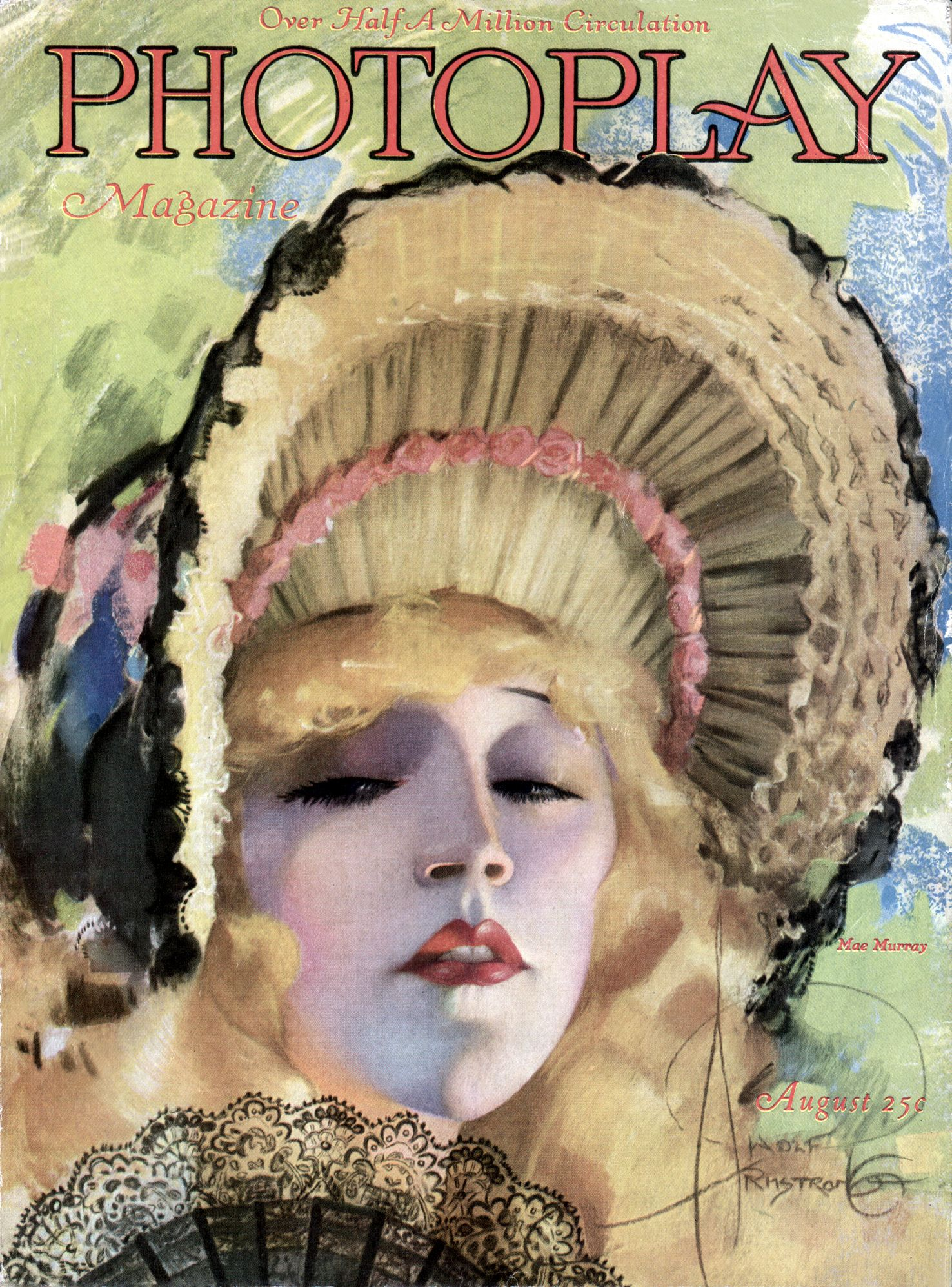
Mae Murray, Photoplay, August 1918

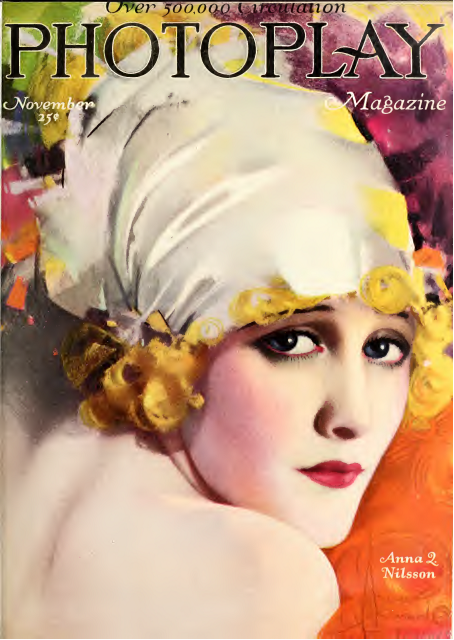
Anna Q. Nilsson, Photoplay, November 1918

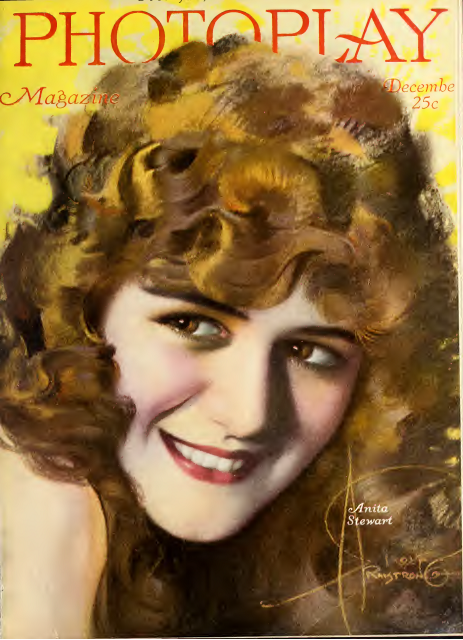
Anita Stewart, Photoplay, December 1918

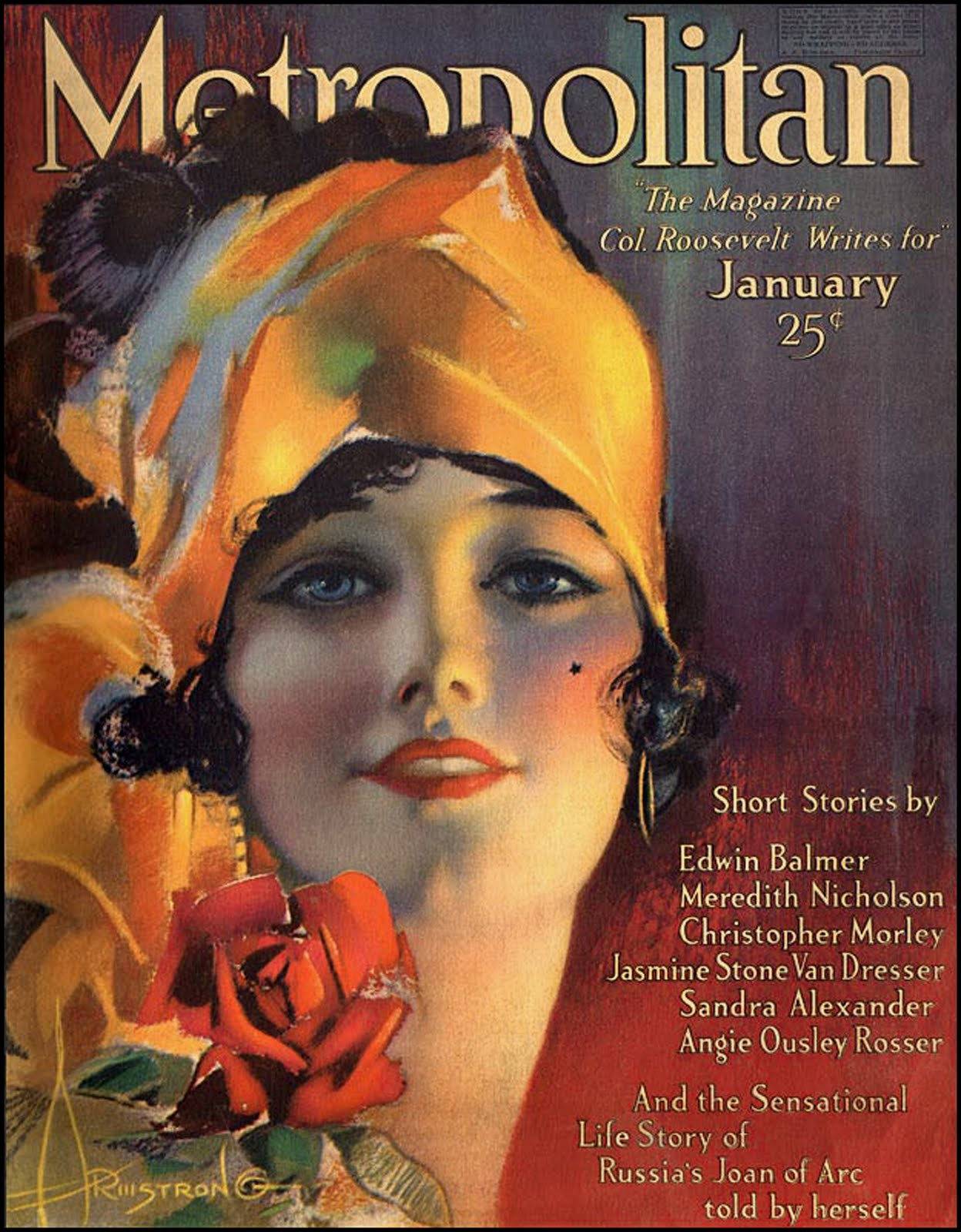
Metropolitan, January 1919

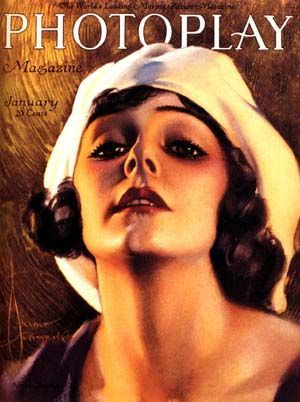
Norma Talmadge, Photoplay, January 1920

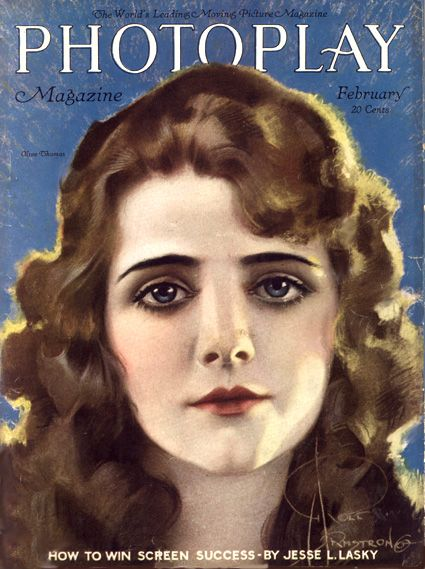
Olive Thomas, Photoplay, February 1920

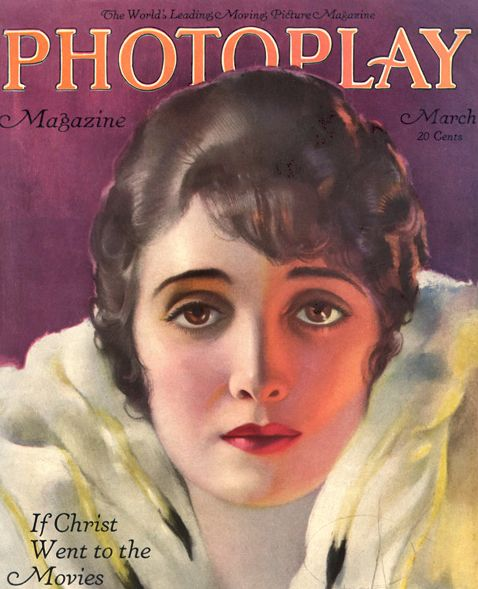
Alice Joyce, Photoplay, March 1920

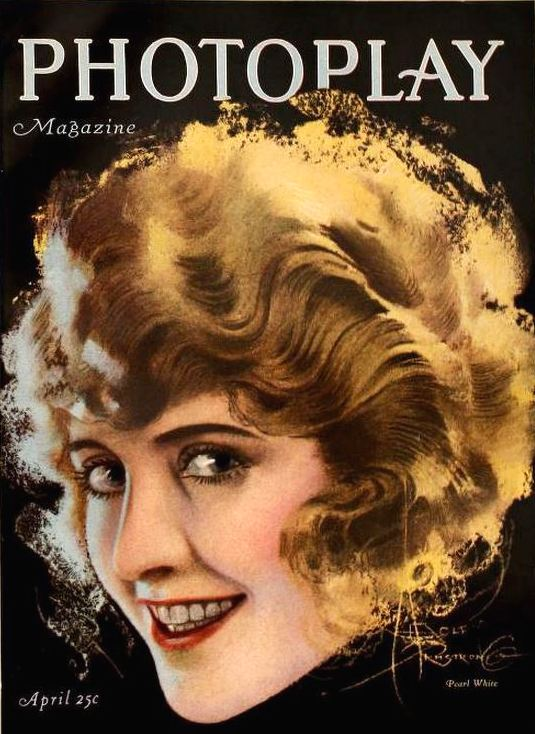
Pearl White, Photoplay, April 1920

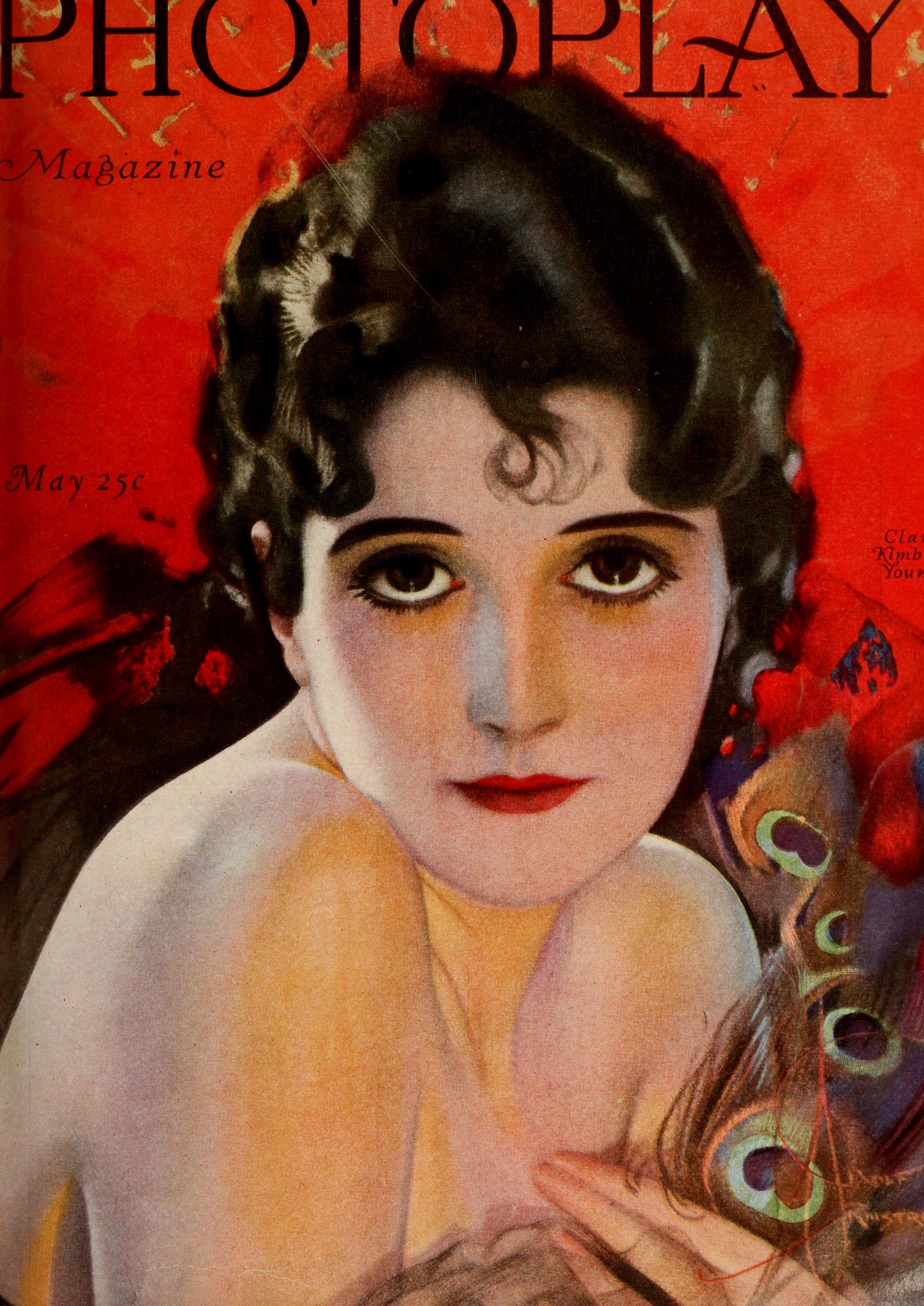
Clara Kimball Young, Photoplay, May 1920

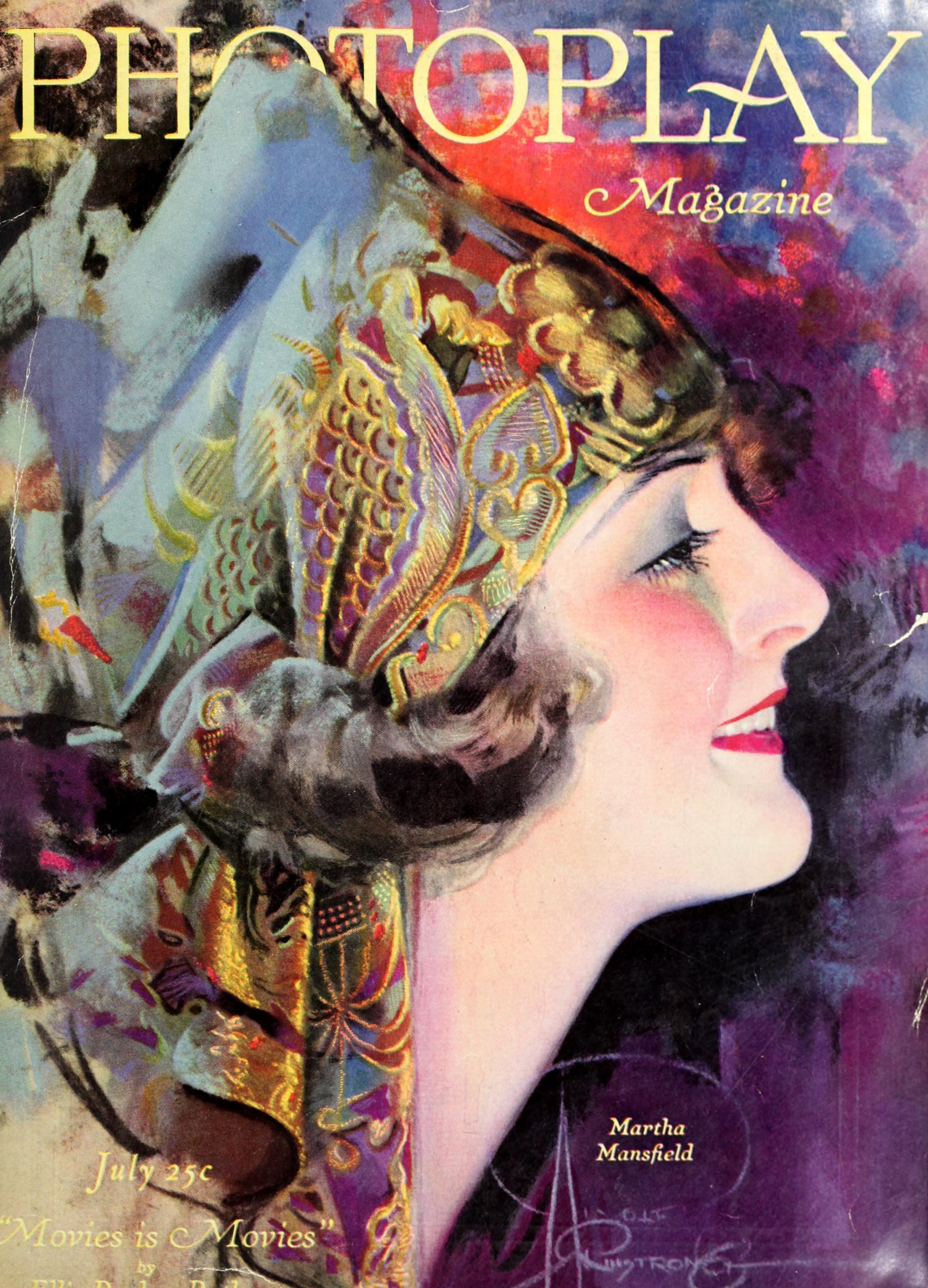
Martha Mansfield, Photoplay, July 1920

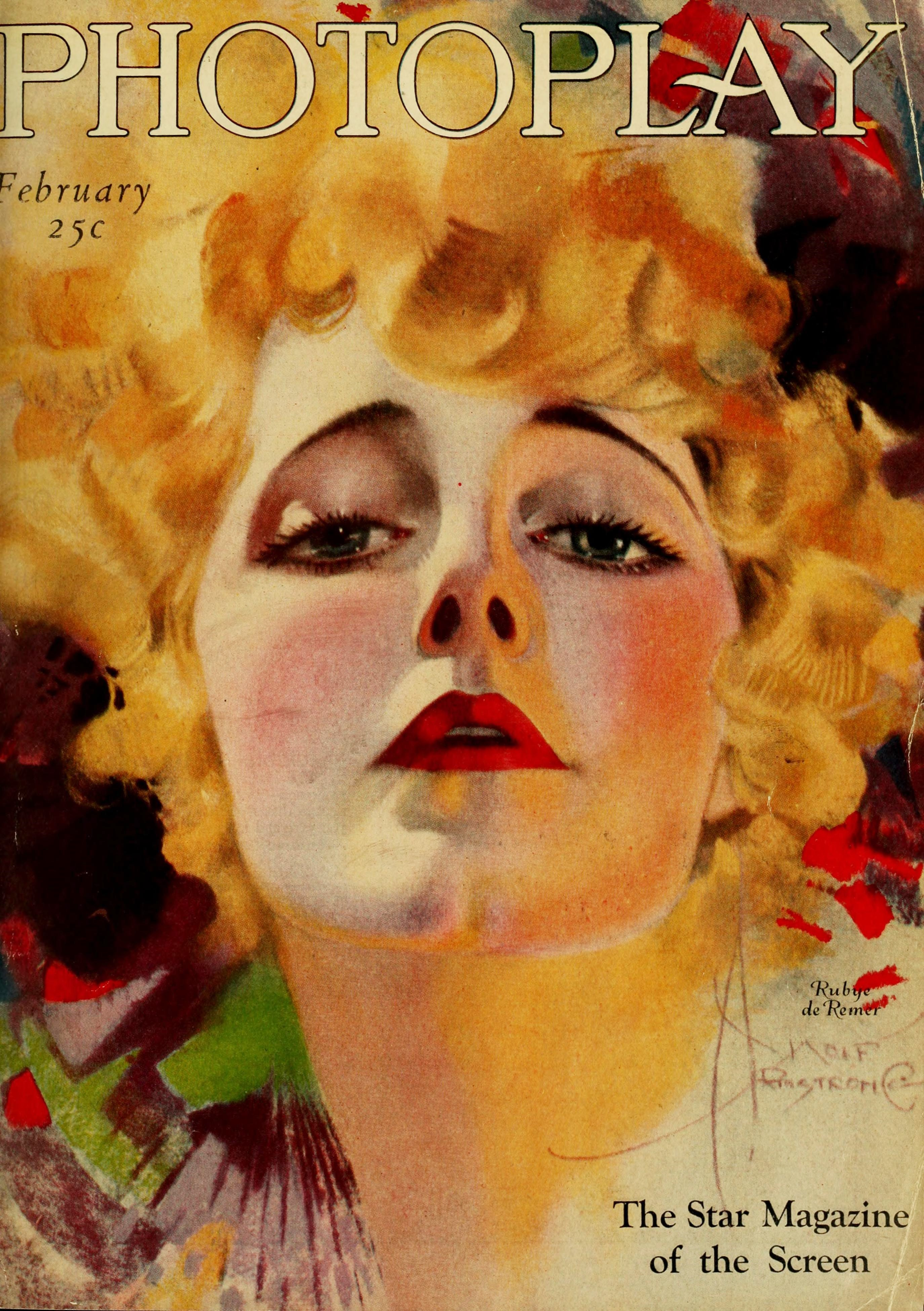
Rubye De Remer, Photoplay, February 1921

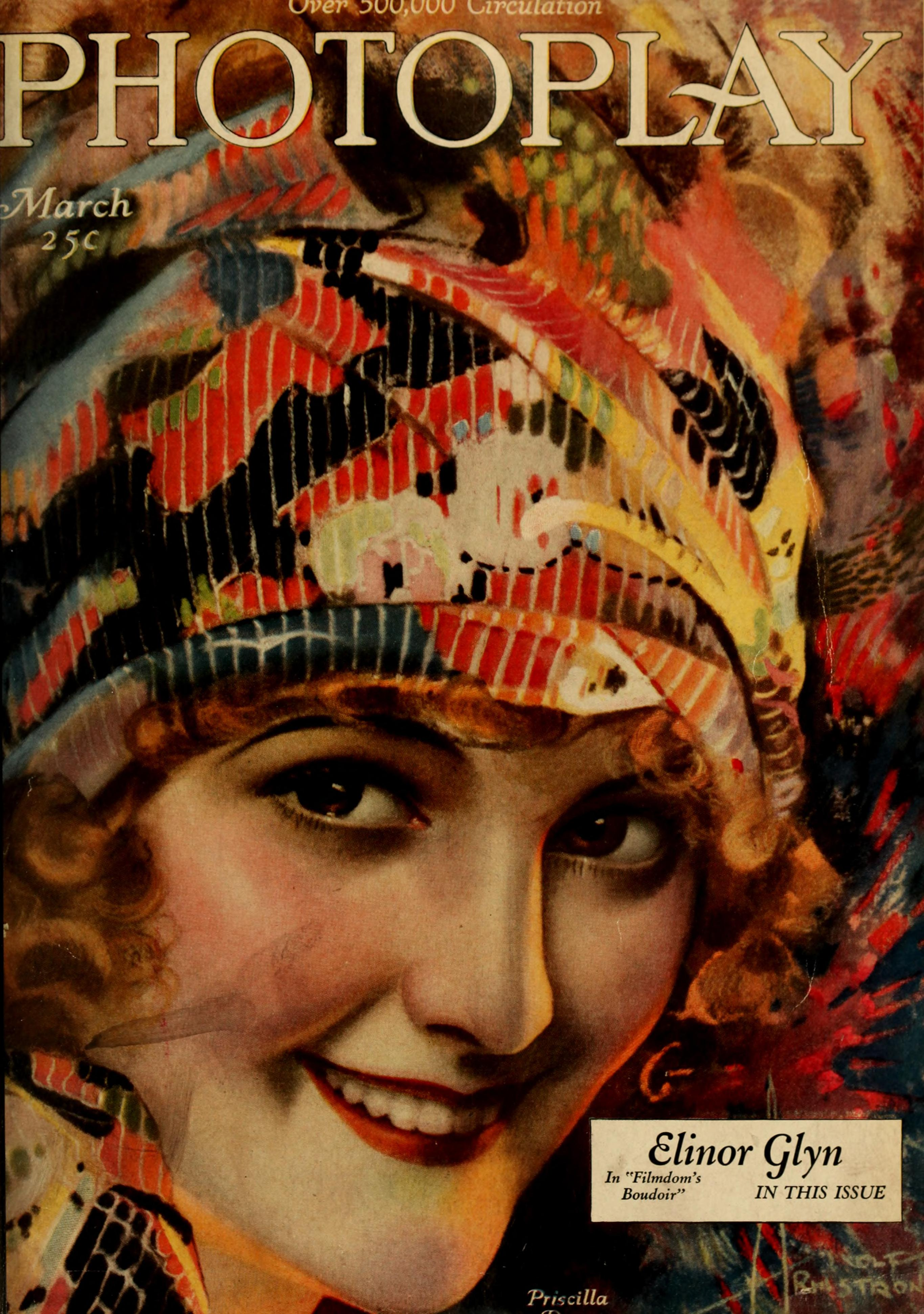
Priscilla Dean, Photoplay, March 1921

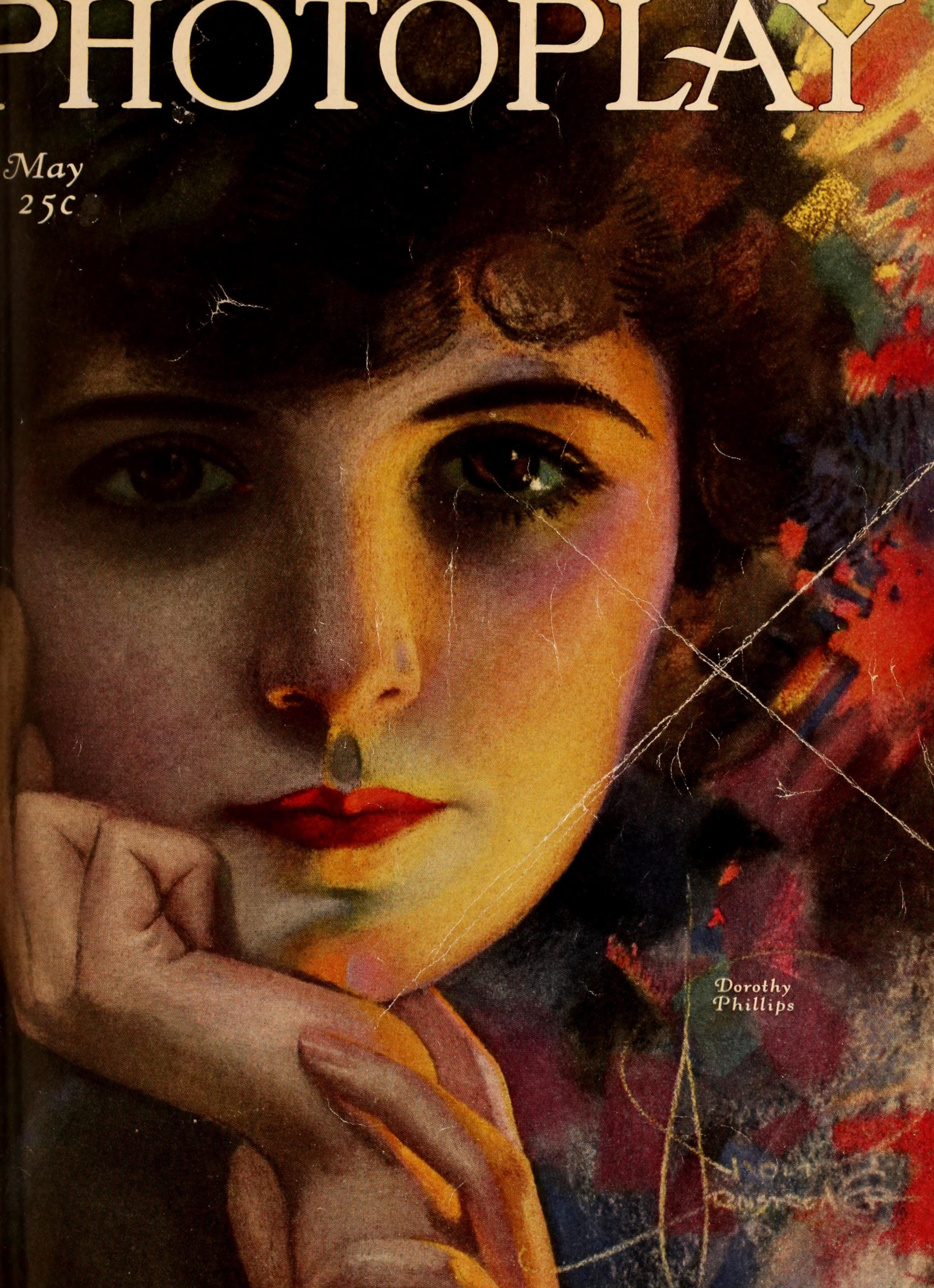
Dorothy Phillips, Photoplay, May 1921

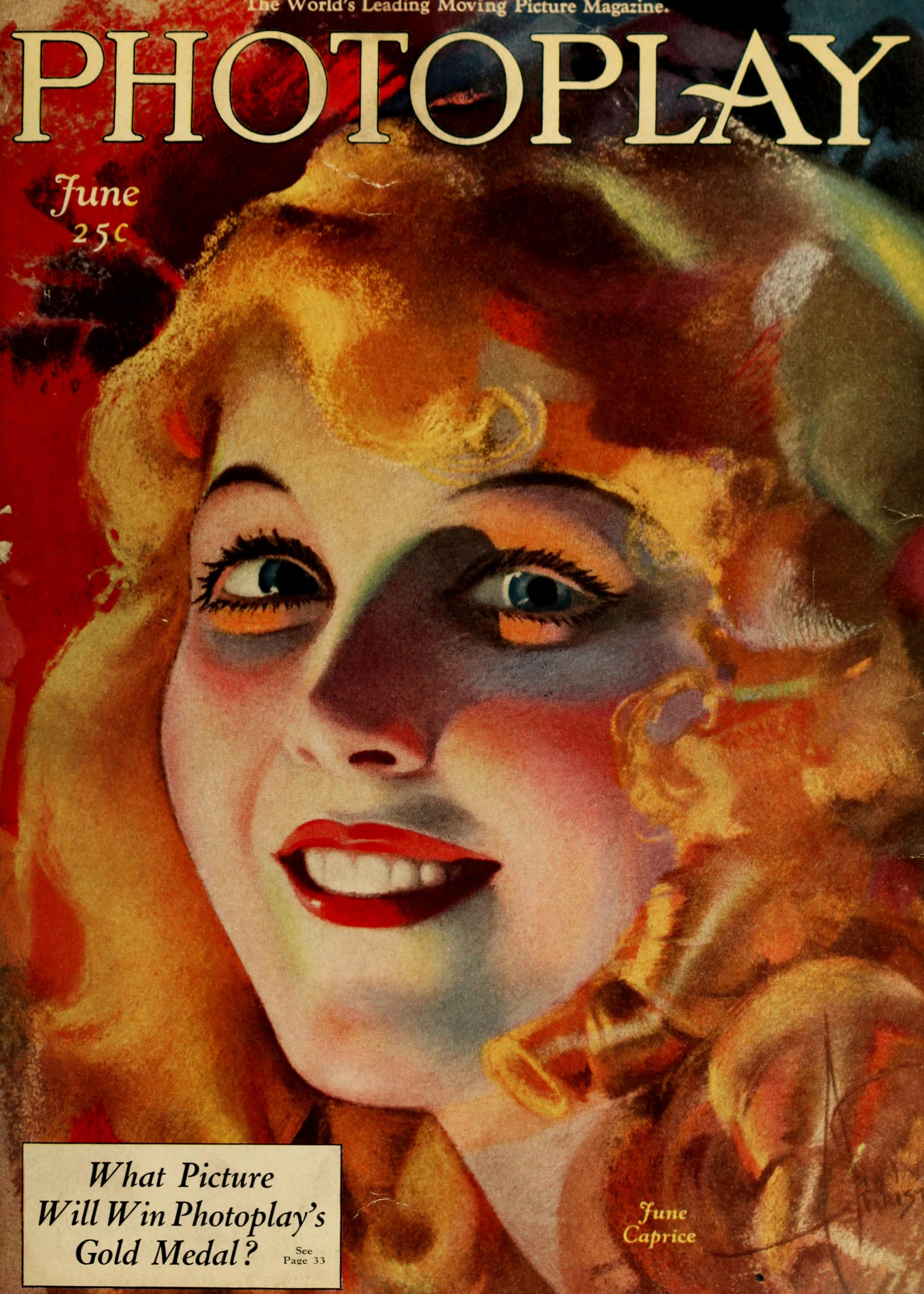
June Caprice, Photoplay, June 1921

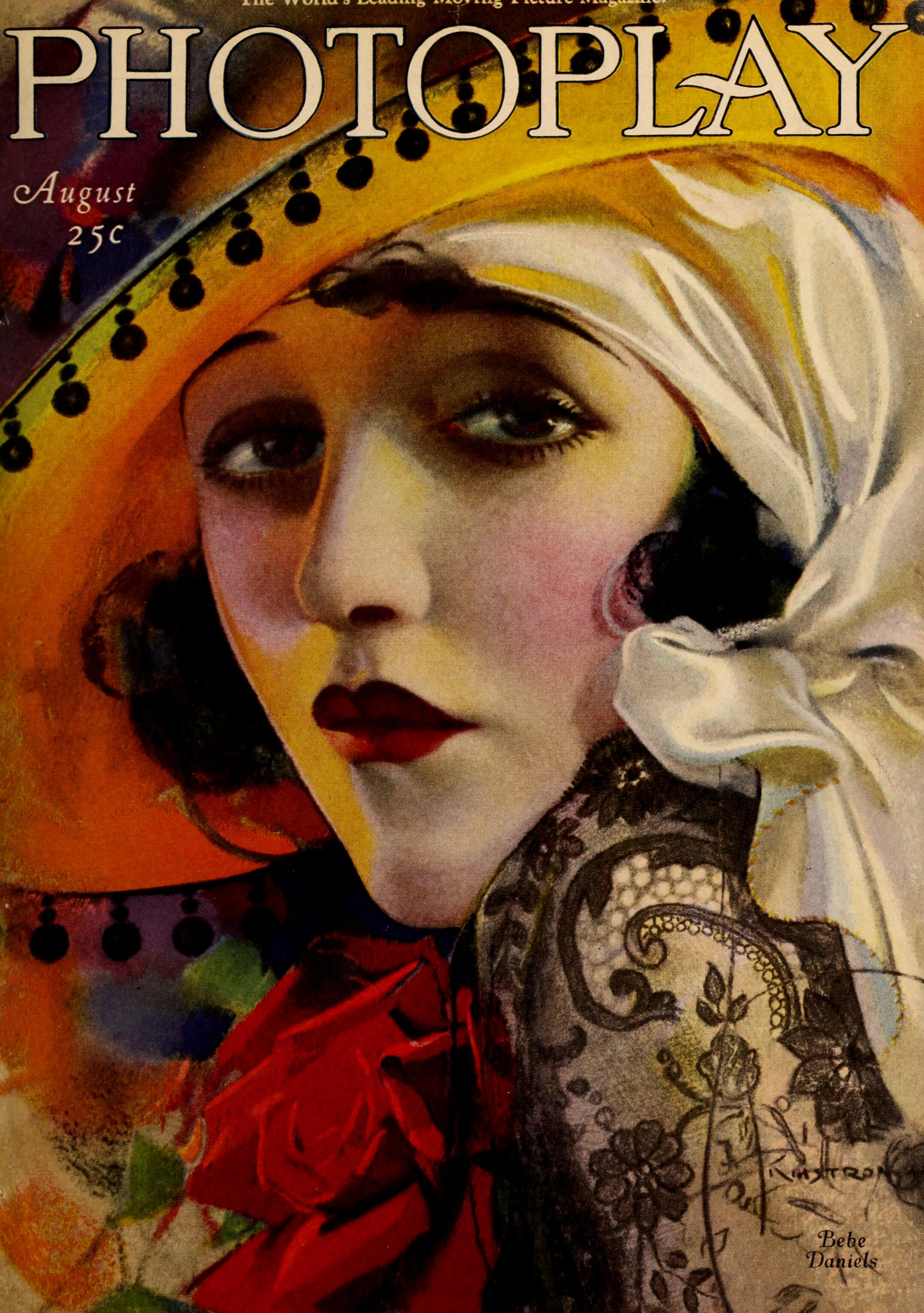
Bebe Daniels, Photoplay, August 1921

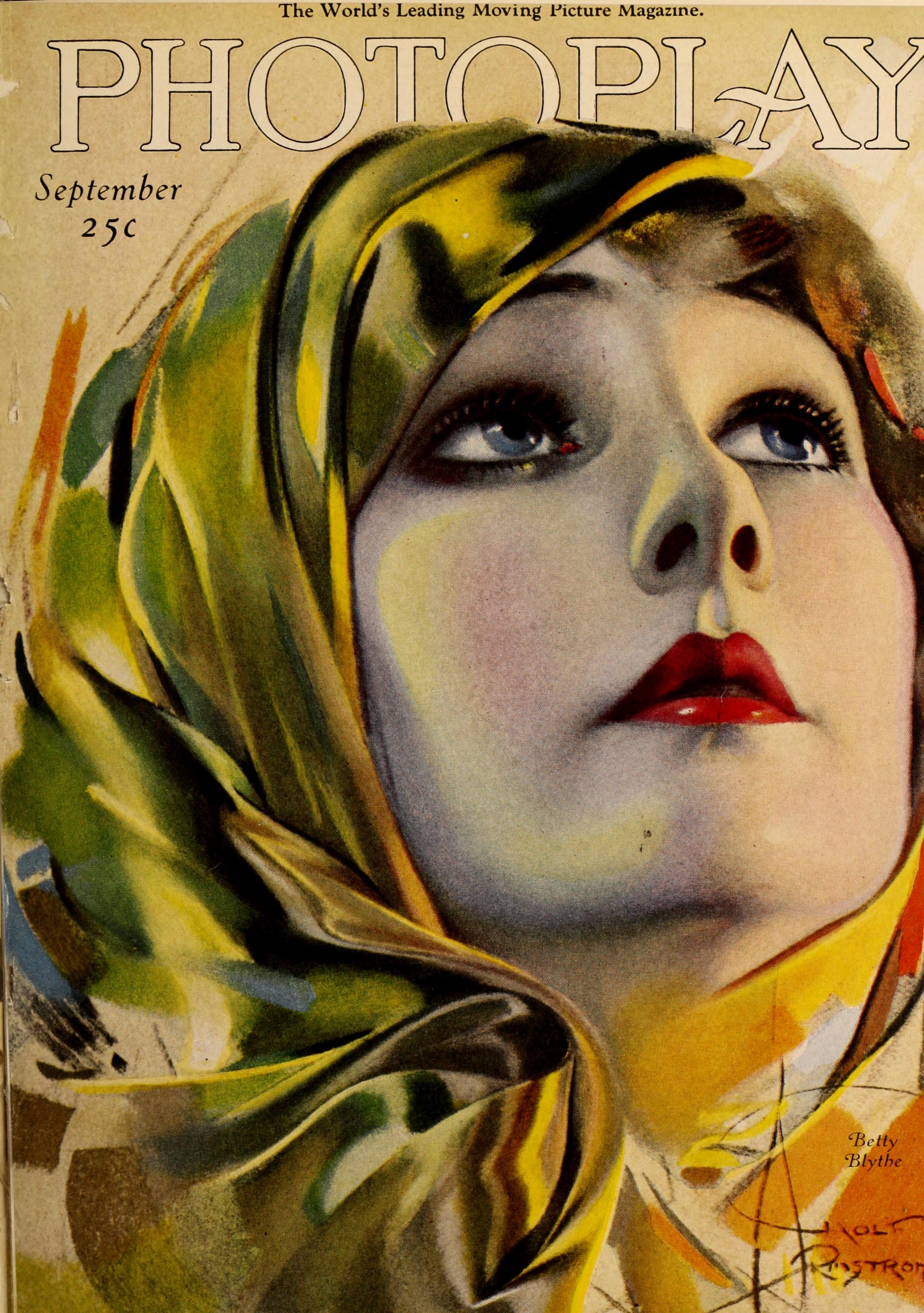
Betty Blythe, Photoplay, September 1921

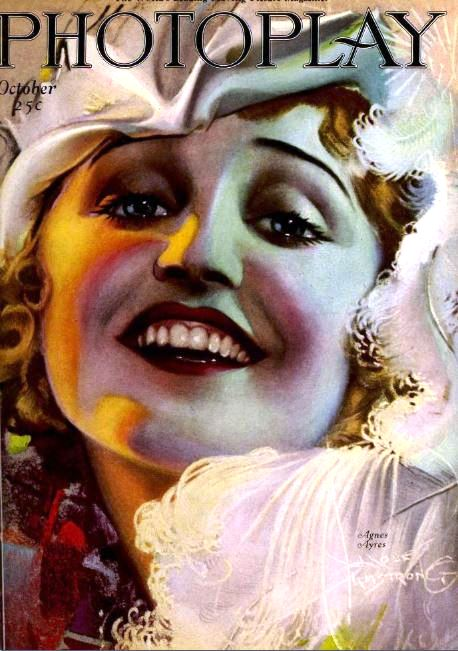
Agnes Ayres, Photoplay, October 1921

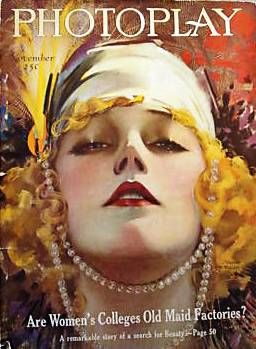
Marion Davies, Photoplay, November 1921

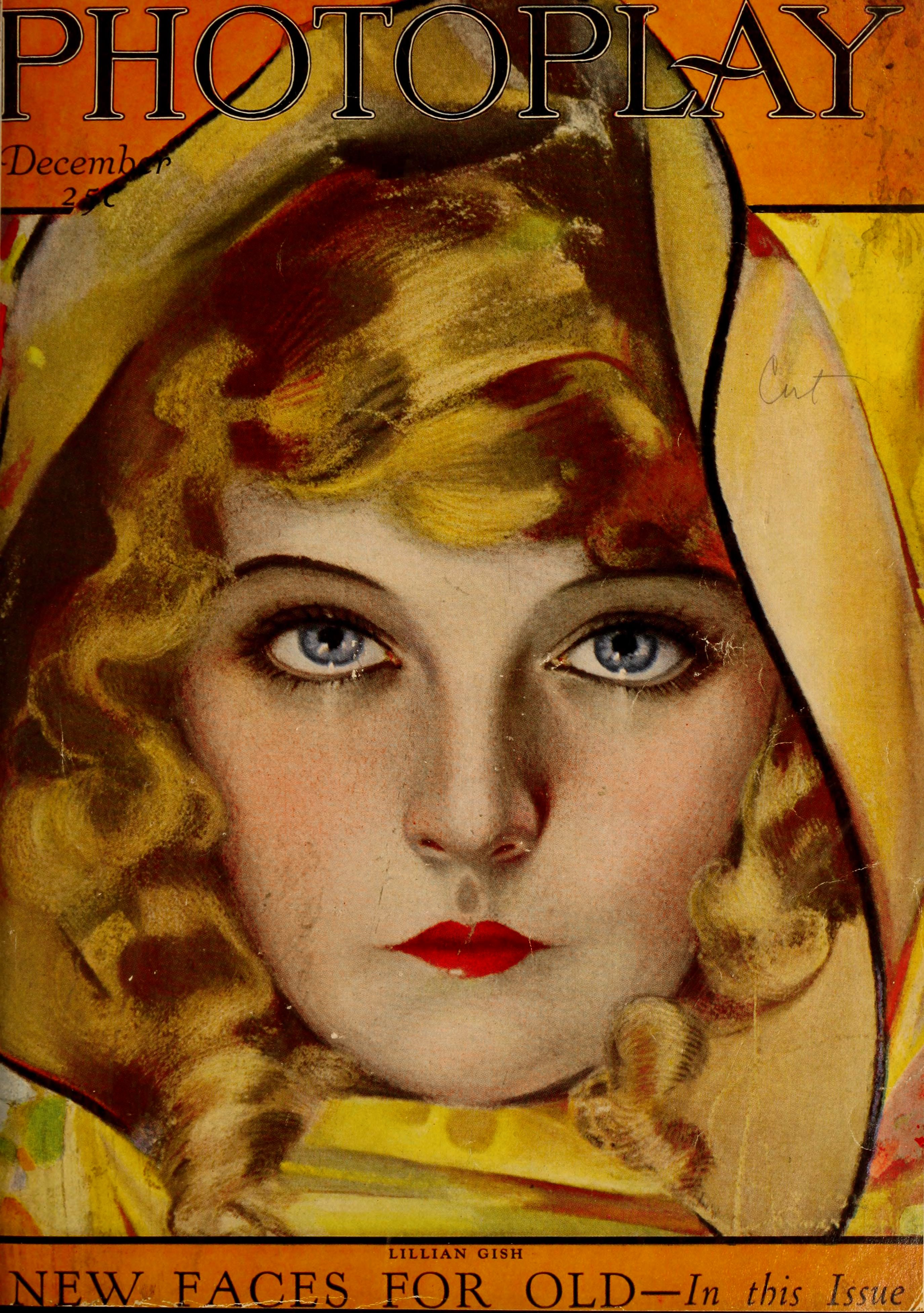
Lillian Gish, Photoplay, December 1921

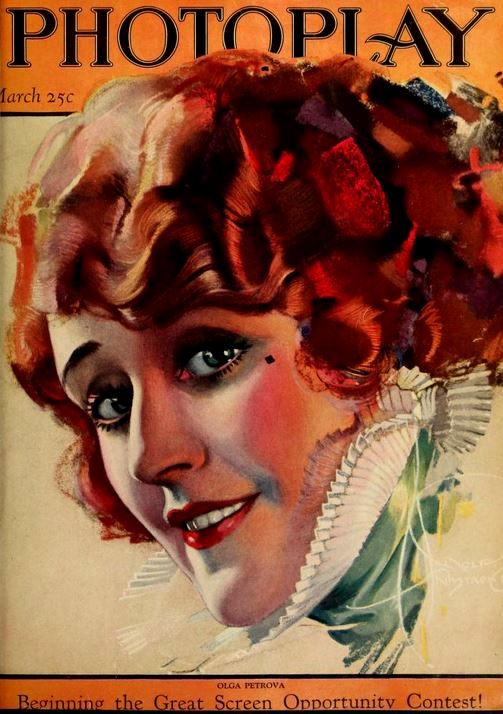
Olga Petrova, Photoplay, March 1922

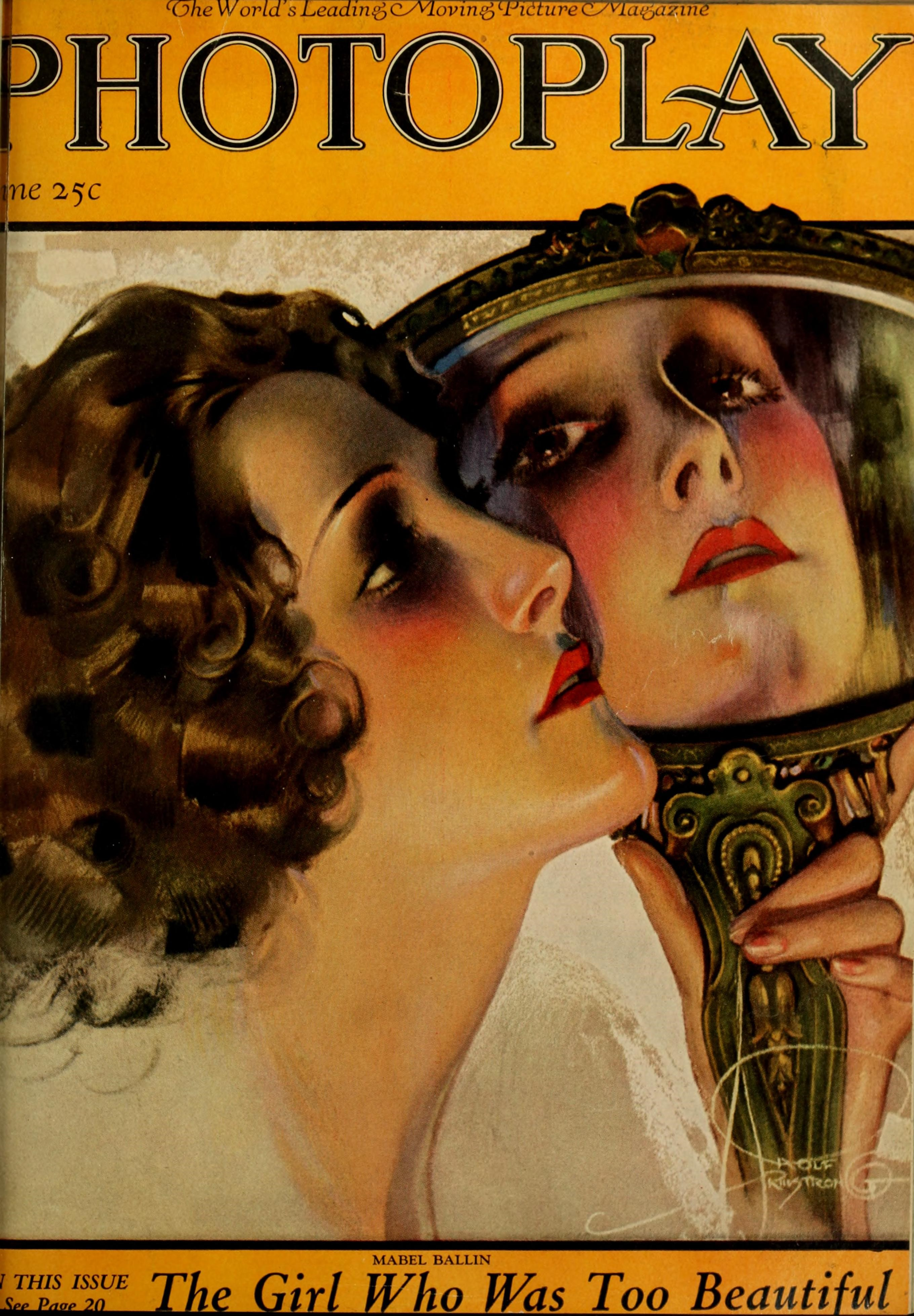
Mabel Ballin, Photoplay, June 1922

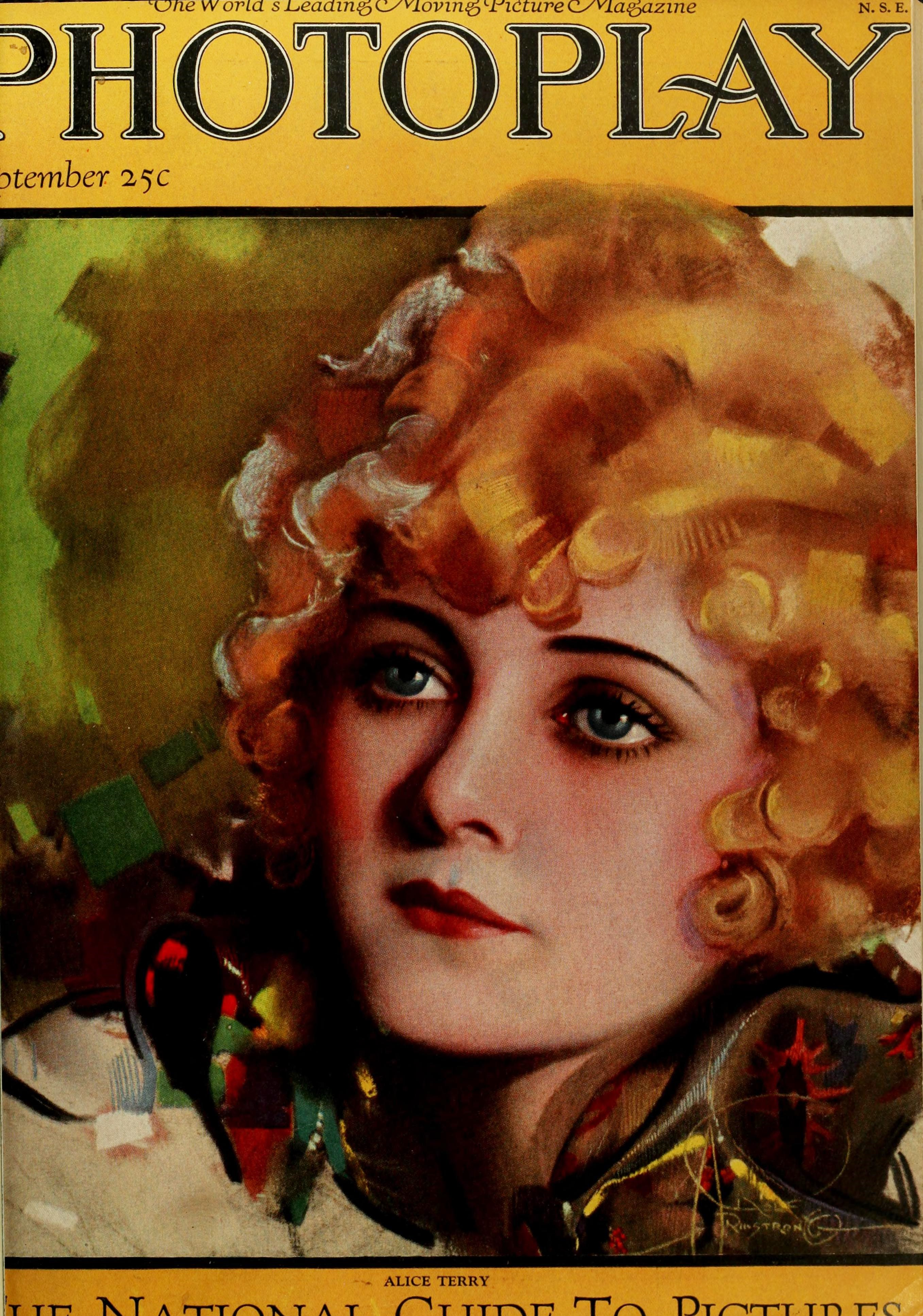
Alice Terry, Photoplay, September 1922

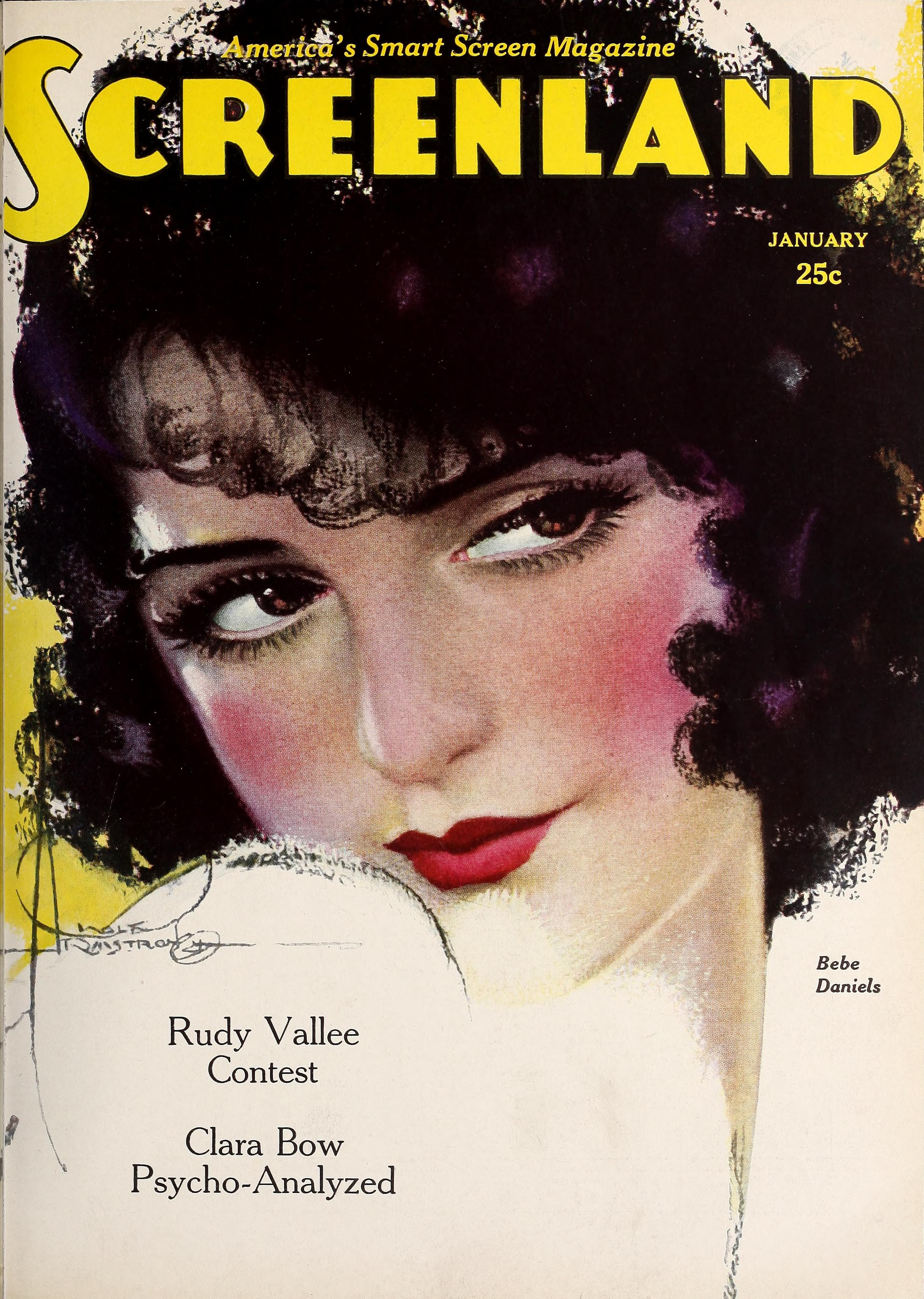
Bebe Daniels, Screenland, January 1930

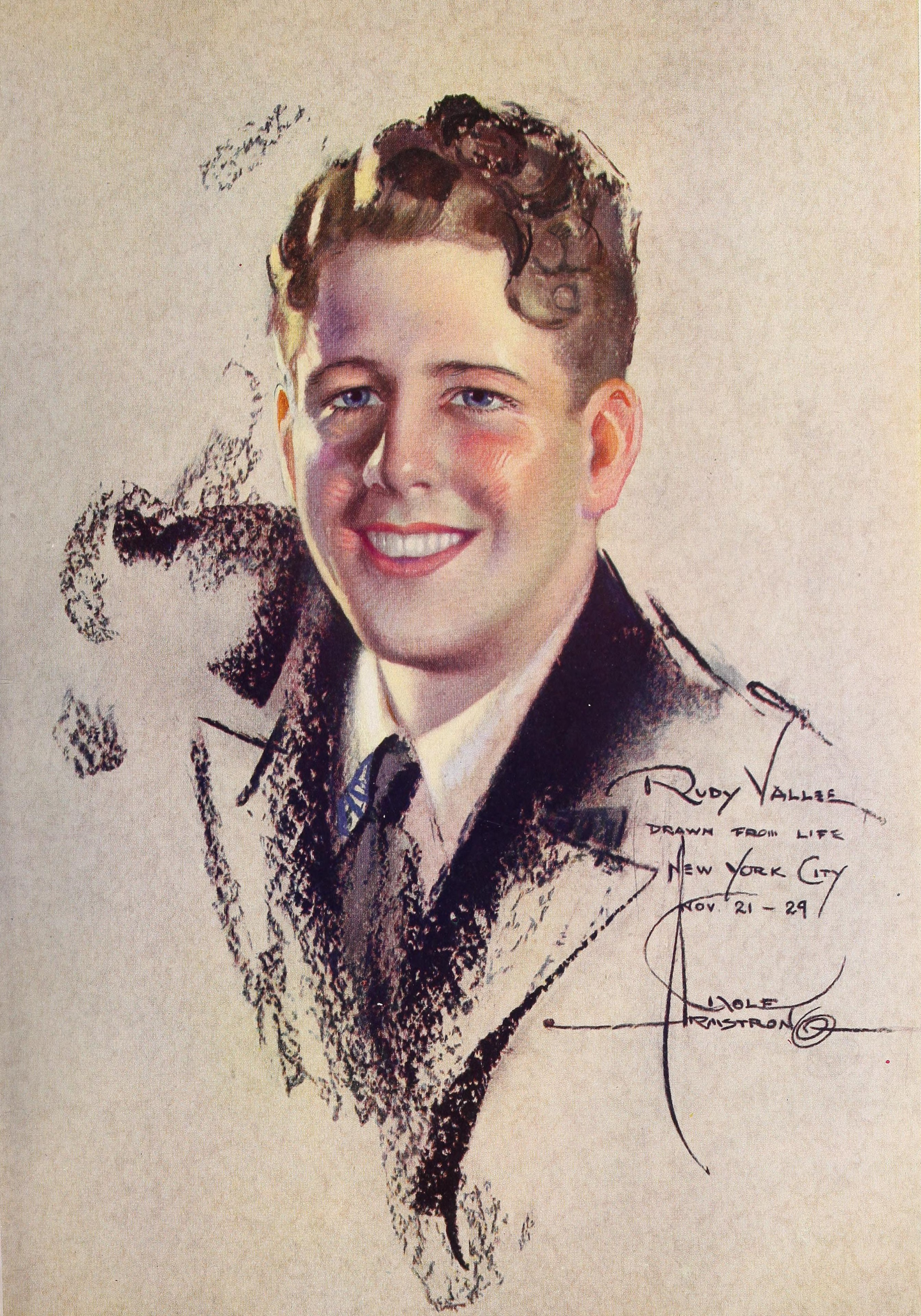
Rudy Vallée, Screenland, January 1930

=== Rolf Armstrong's Gallery of Screen Beauties ===
In the January 1930 issue of Screenland, Rolf Armstrong chose 16 actresses to symbolize different colors. Here are the original captions and portraits in the order which they appeared in the magazine.

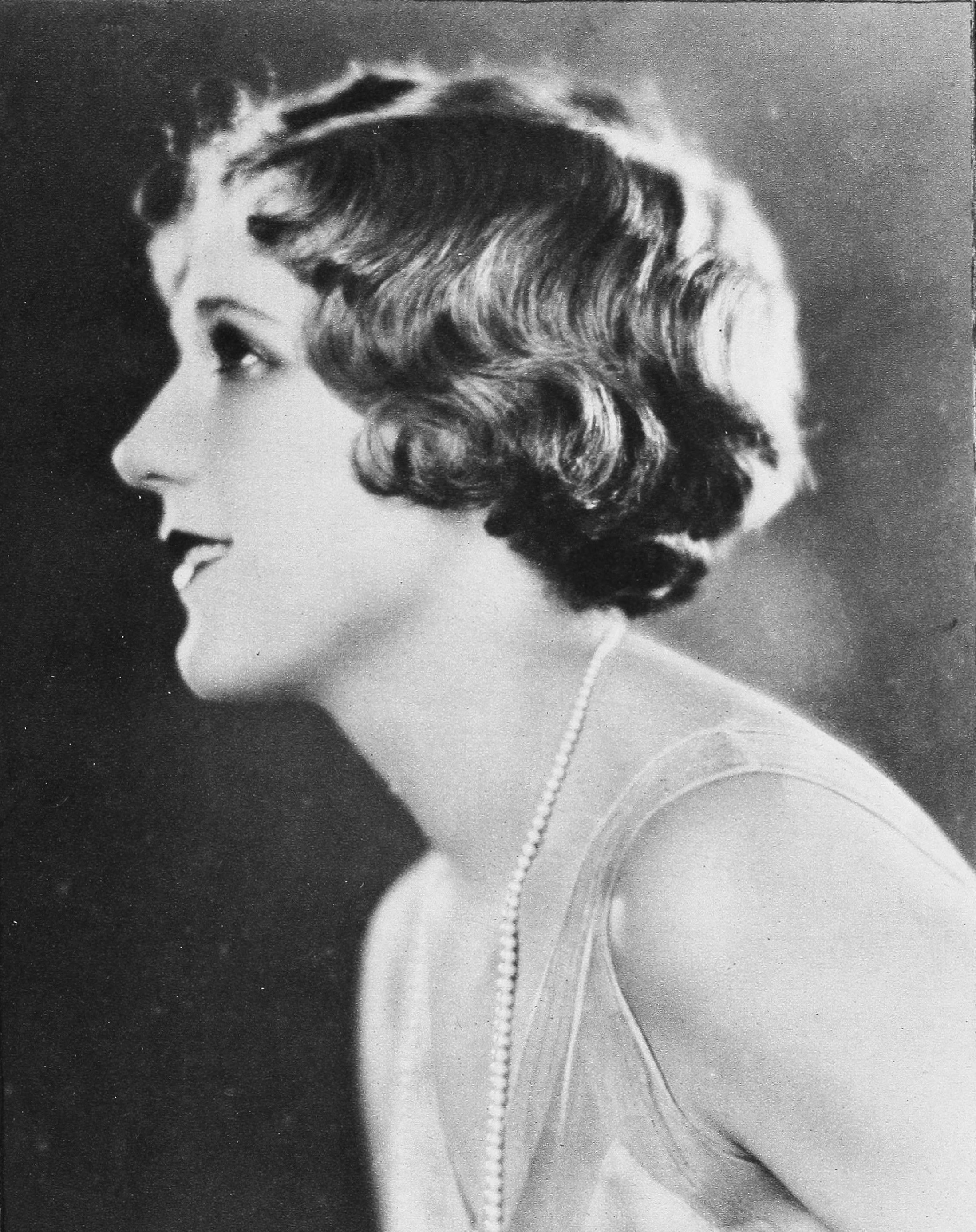
White - Light could not be painted without it. No other color can take its place. - Mary Pickford

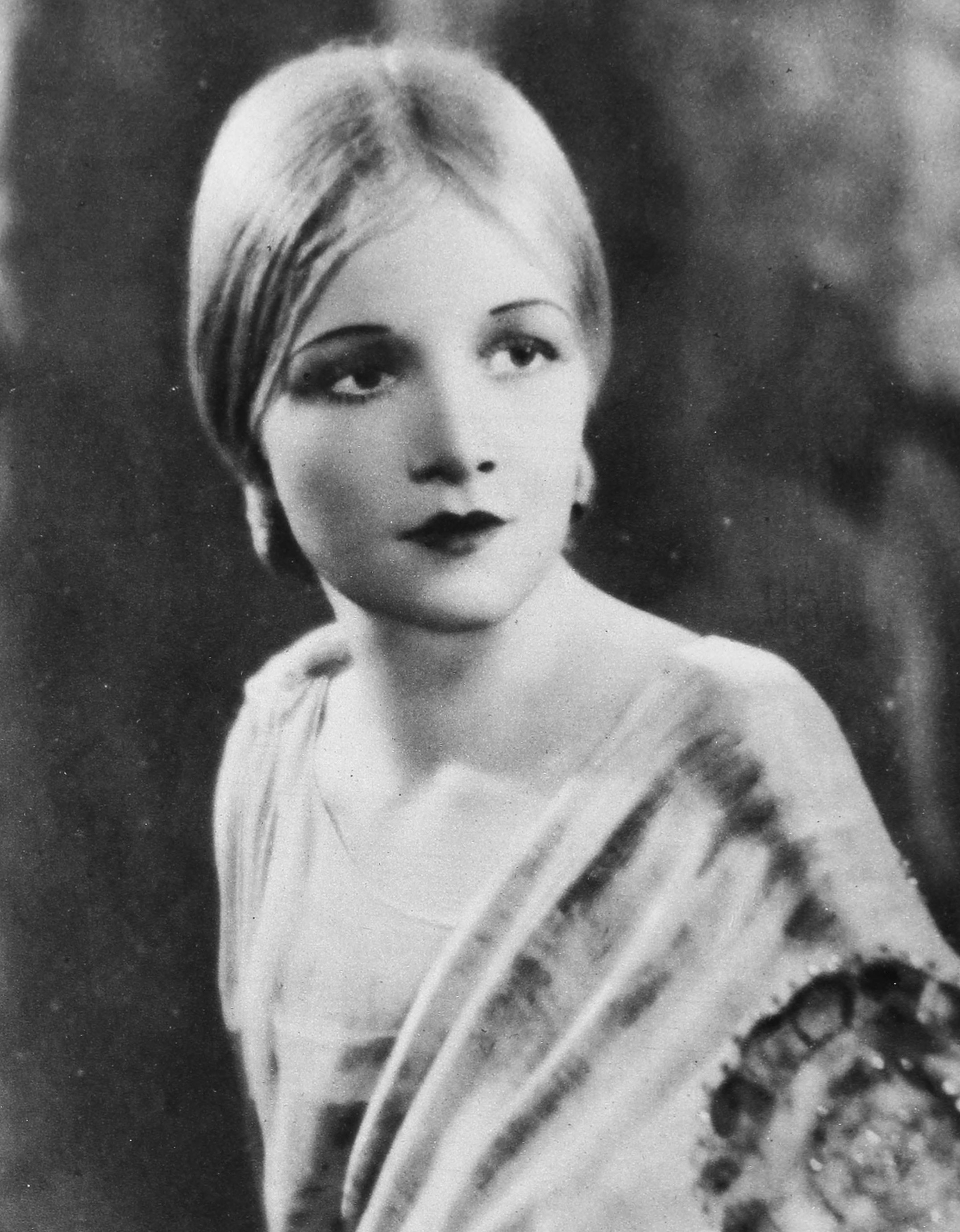
Lemon Yellow - The tip of a flame. Pale winter sunlight. - Ann Harding

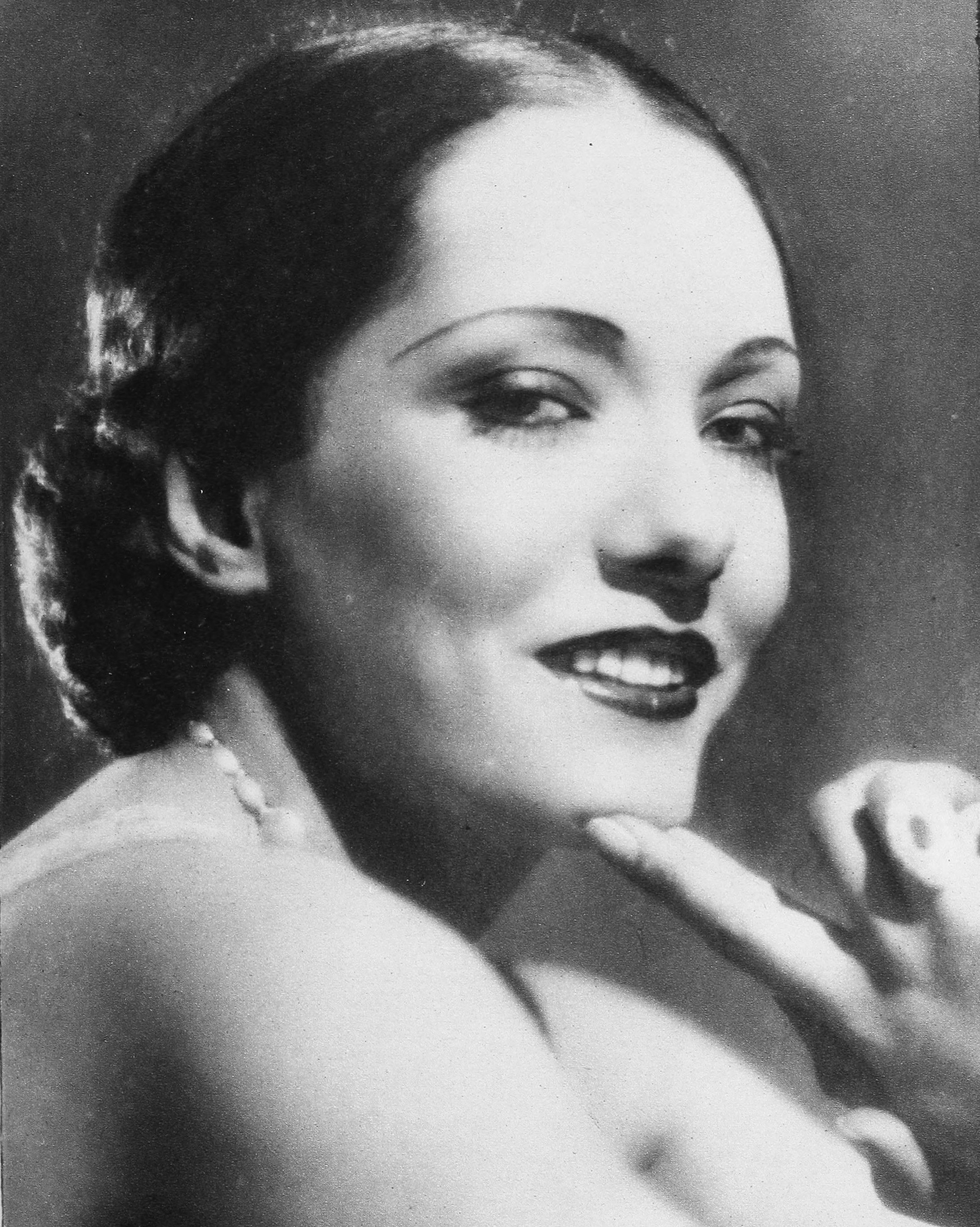
Chrome Yellow - The gypsy color—primitive, elemental. - Lupe Vélez

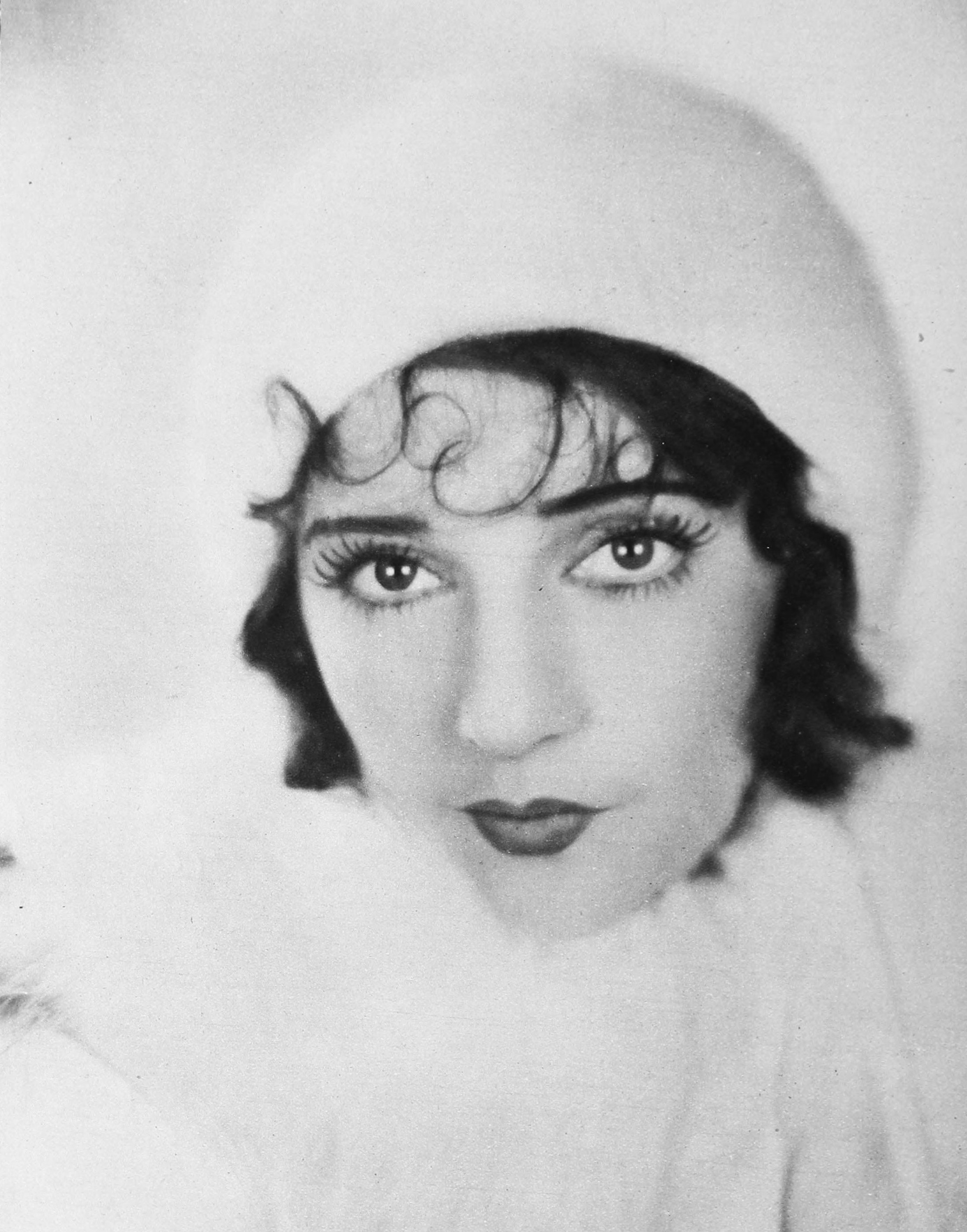
Cadmium Orange - The glowing combination of red and yellow. - Bebe Daniels

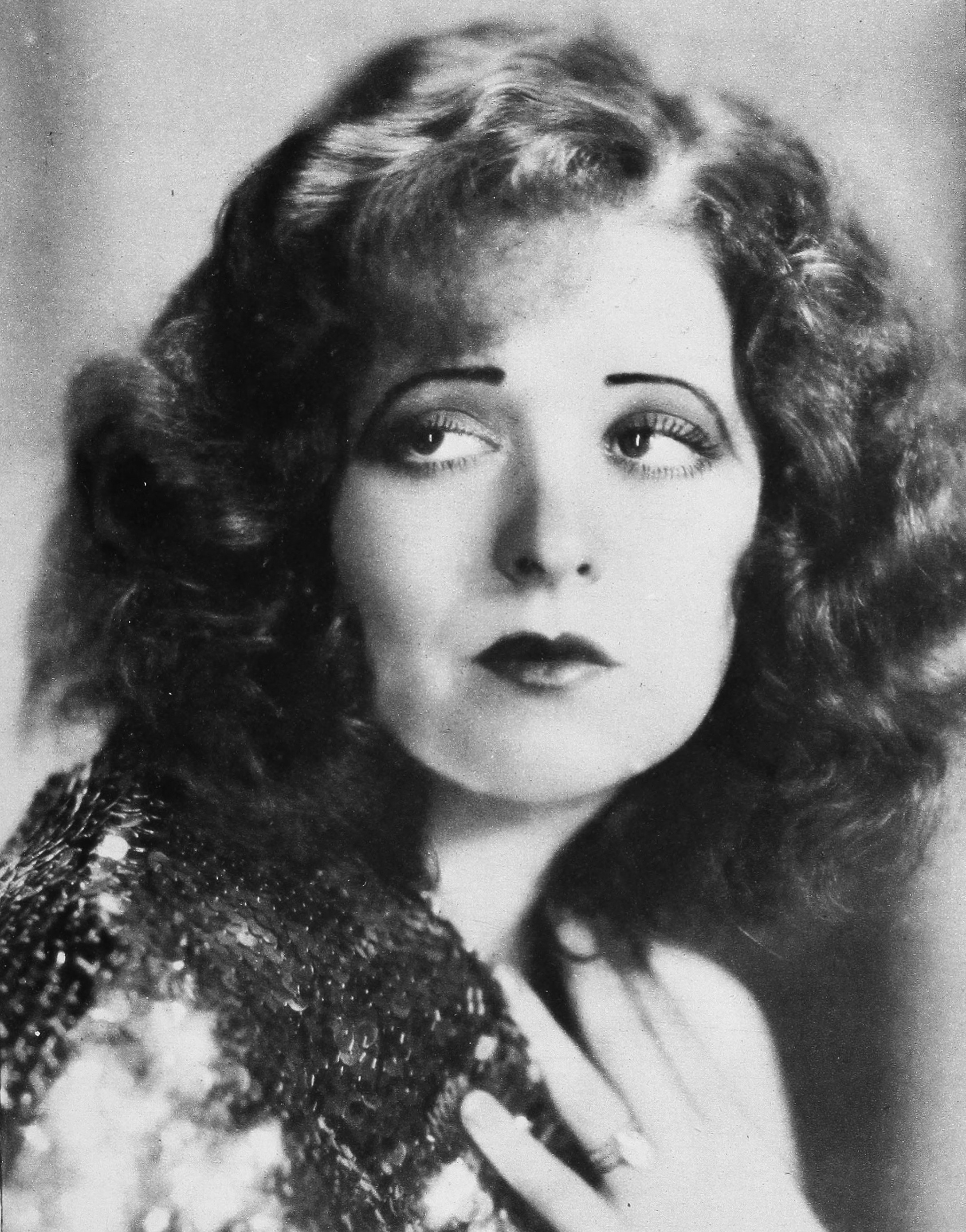
Vermilion - Vibrant: dominating: dynamic. - Clara Bow

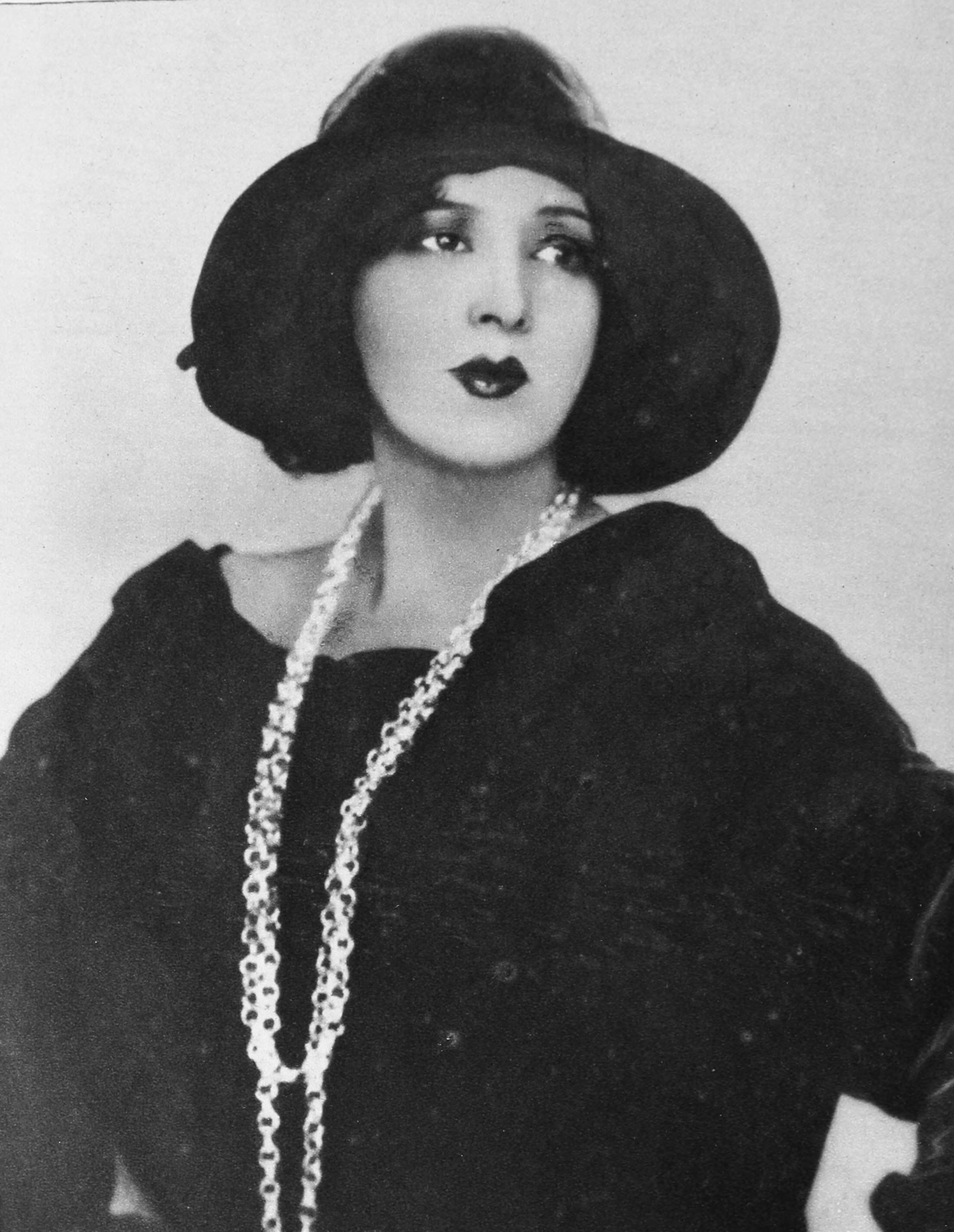
Rose Madder - Dusky, rich, deep red—color of roses and rubies. - Estelle Taylor

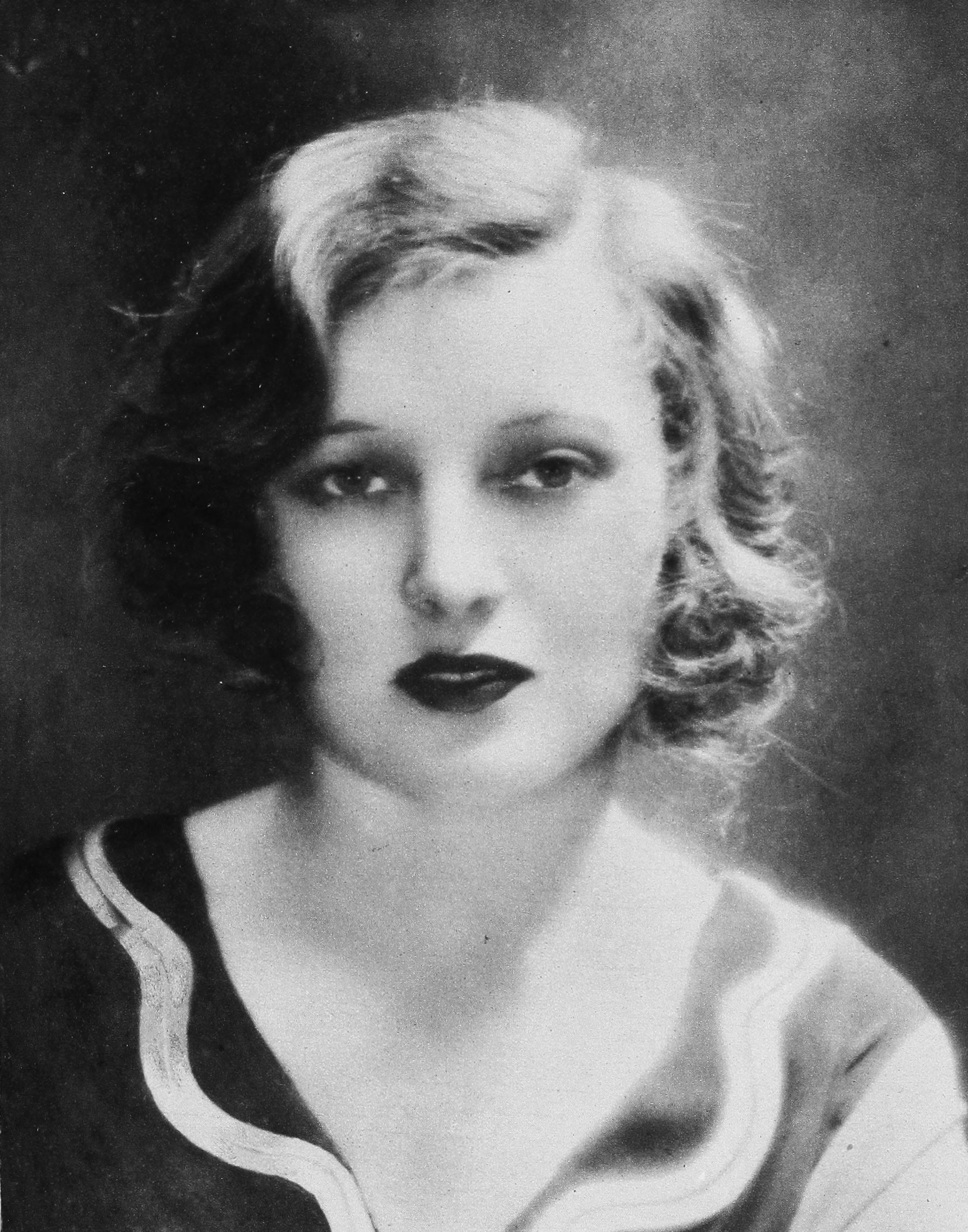
Cobalt Violet - Evocative of fragile, costly, sophisticated femininity. - Corinne Griffith

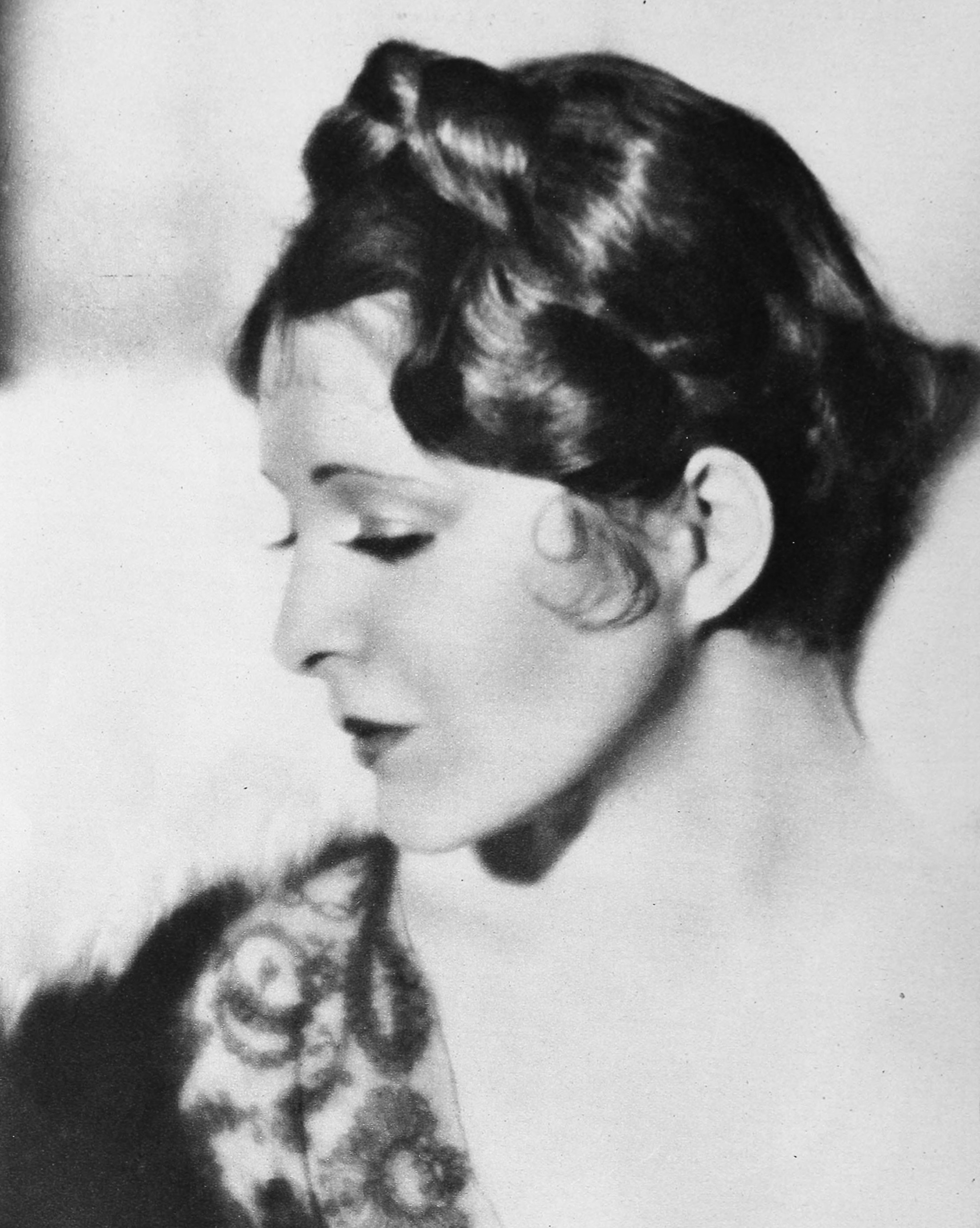
Cobalt Blue - Clear, definite, polished blue of enamels. - Billie Dove

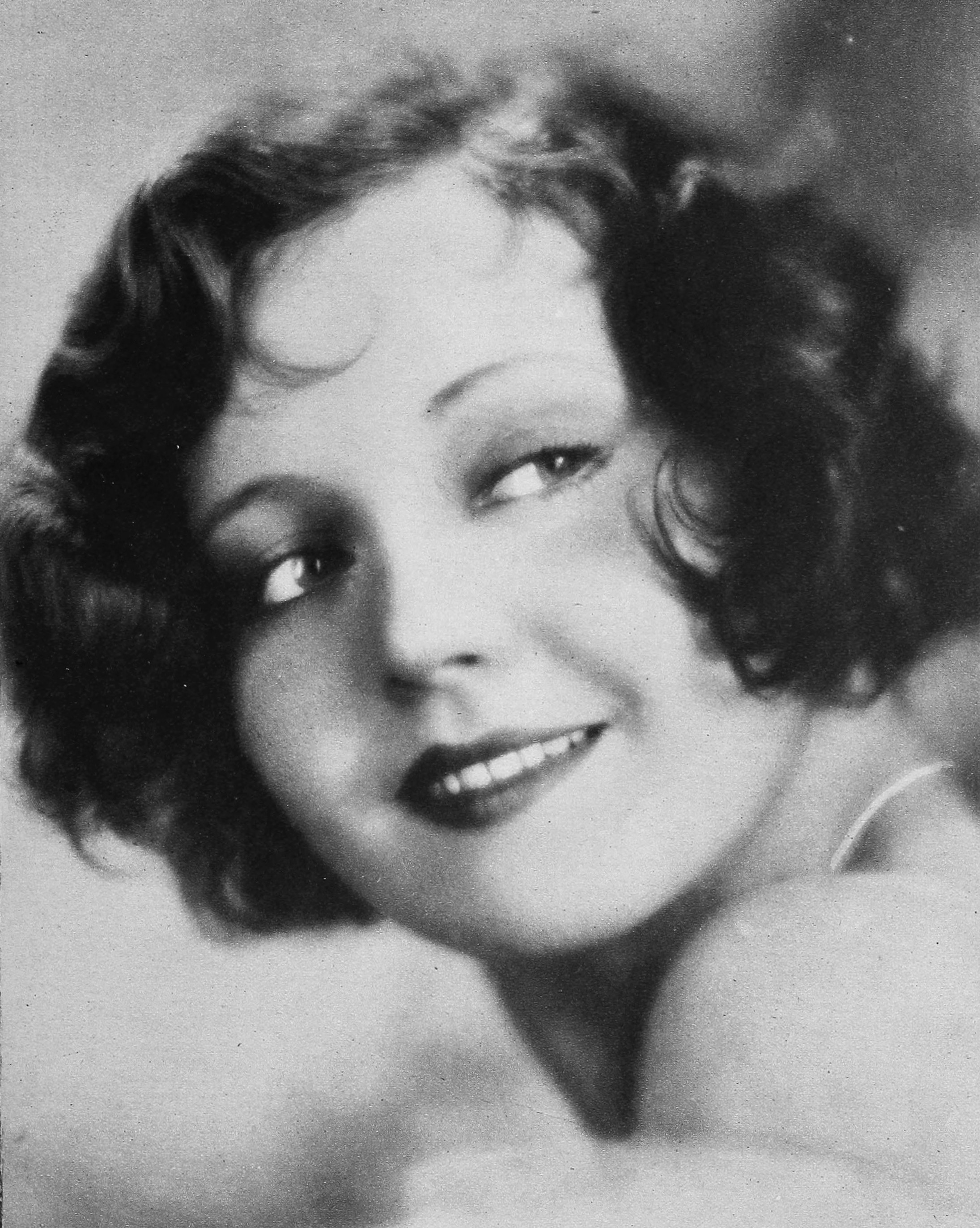
Willow Green - Youth. The color of Spring. - Nancy Carroll

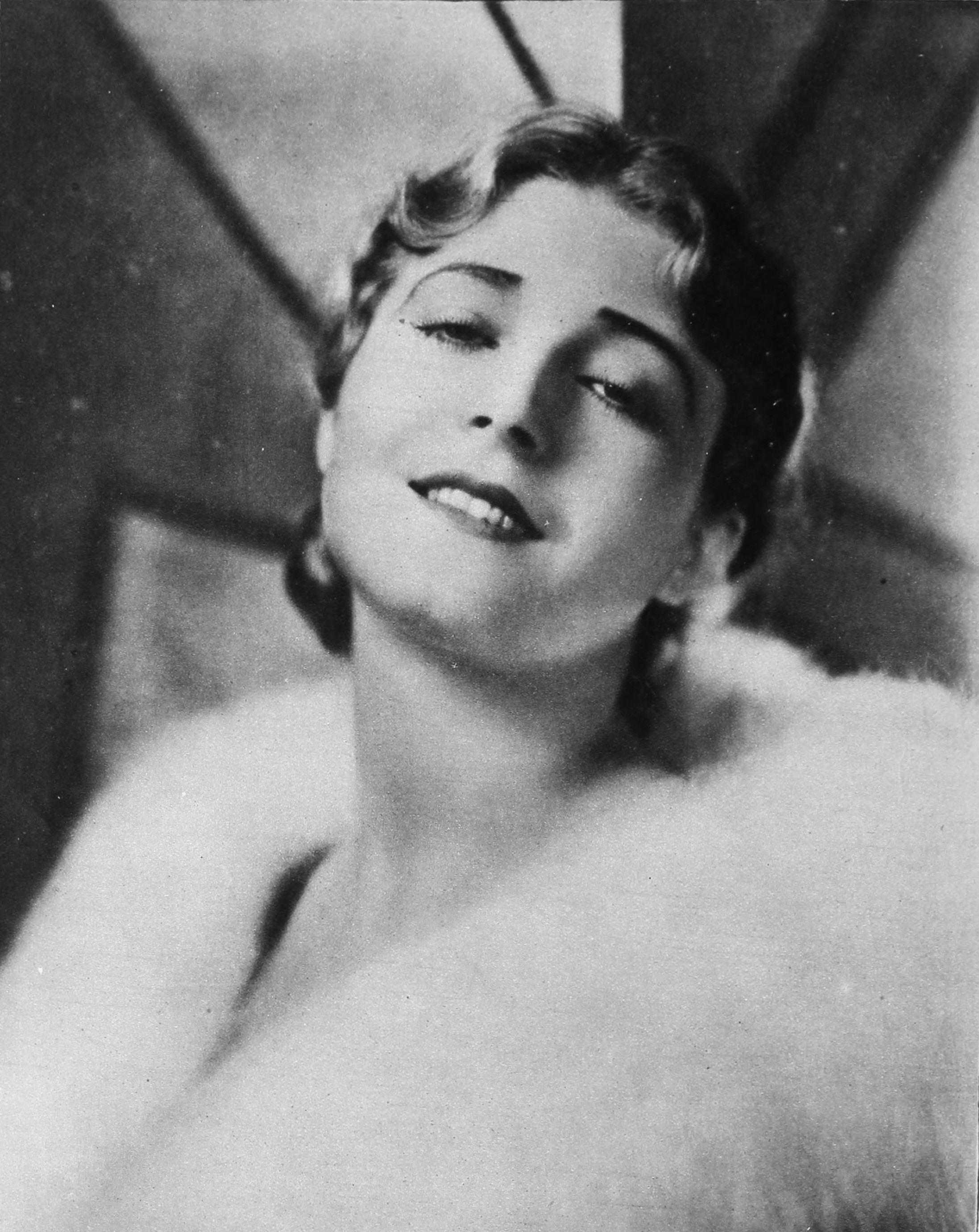
Cerulean Blue - Smiling, unclouded perfection of summer skies. - Vilma Banky

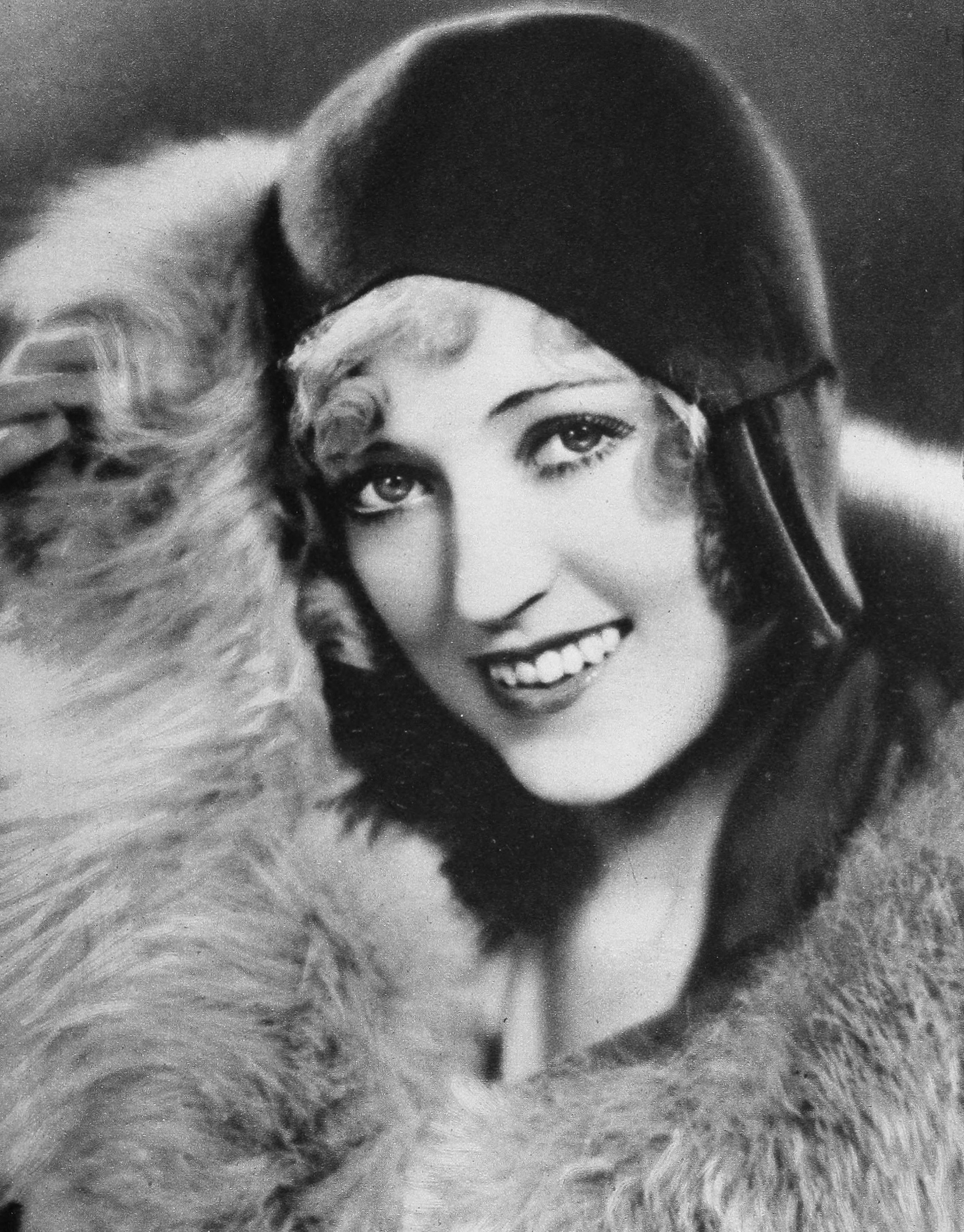
Emerald Green - Gay, vivid, daring—a rollicking, sparkling color. - Marion Davies

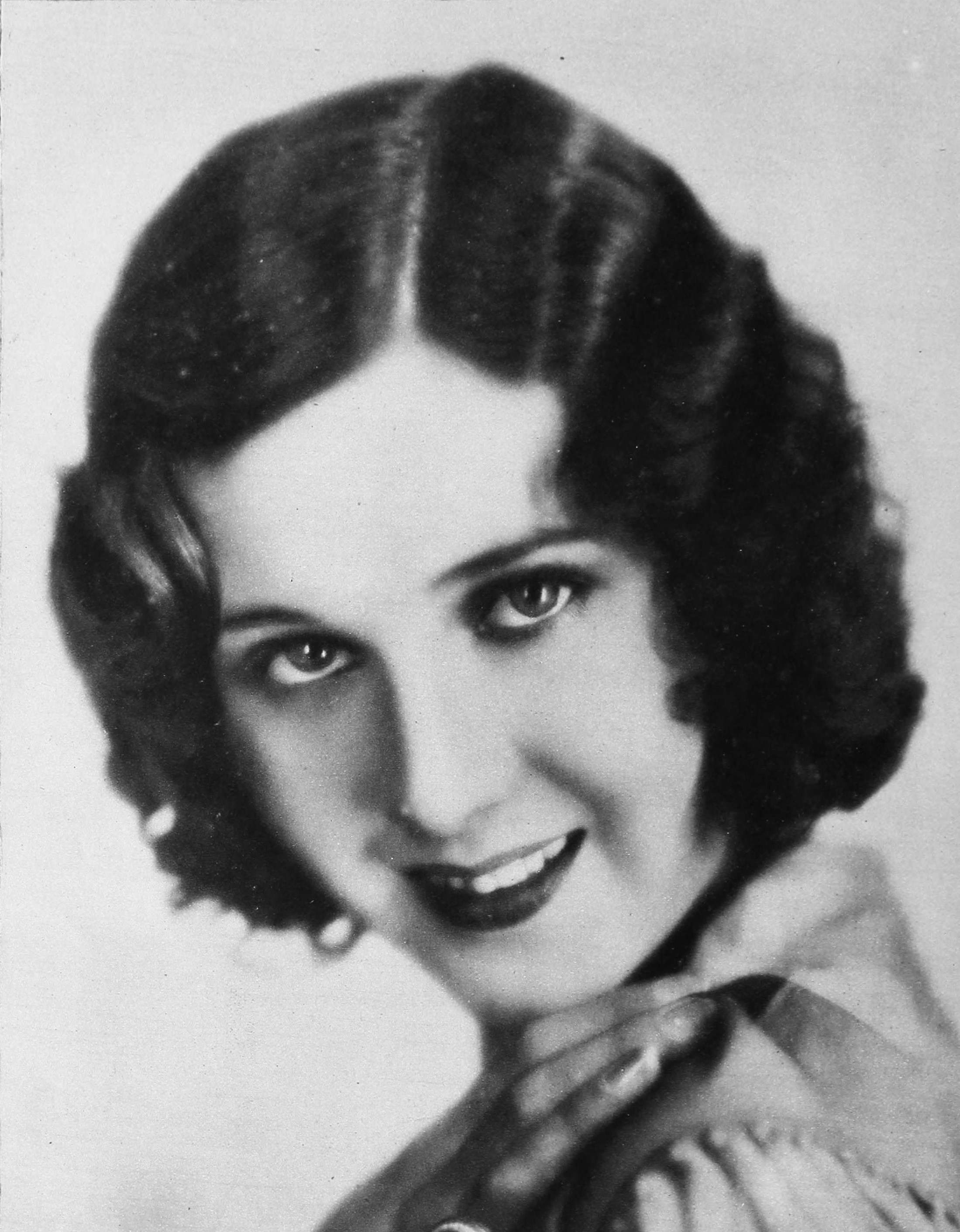
Ultramarine Blue - Vigorous, direct—color of sunny seas. - Mary Brian

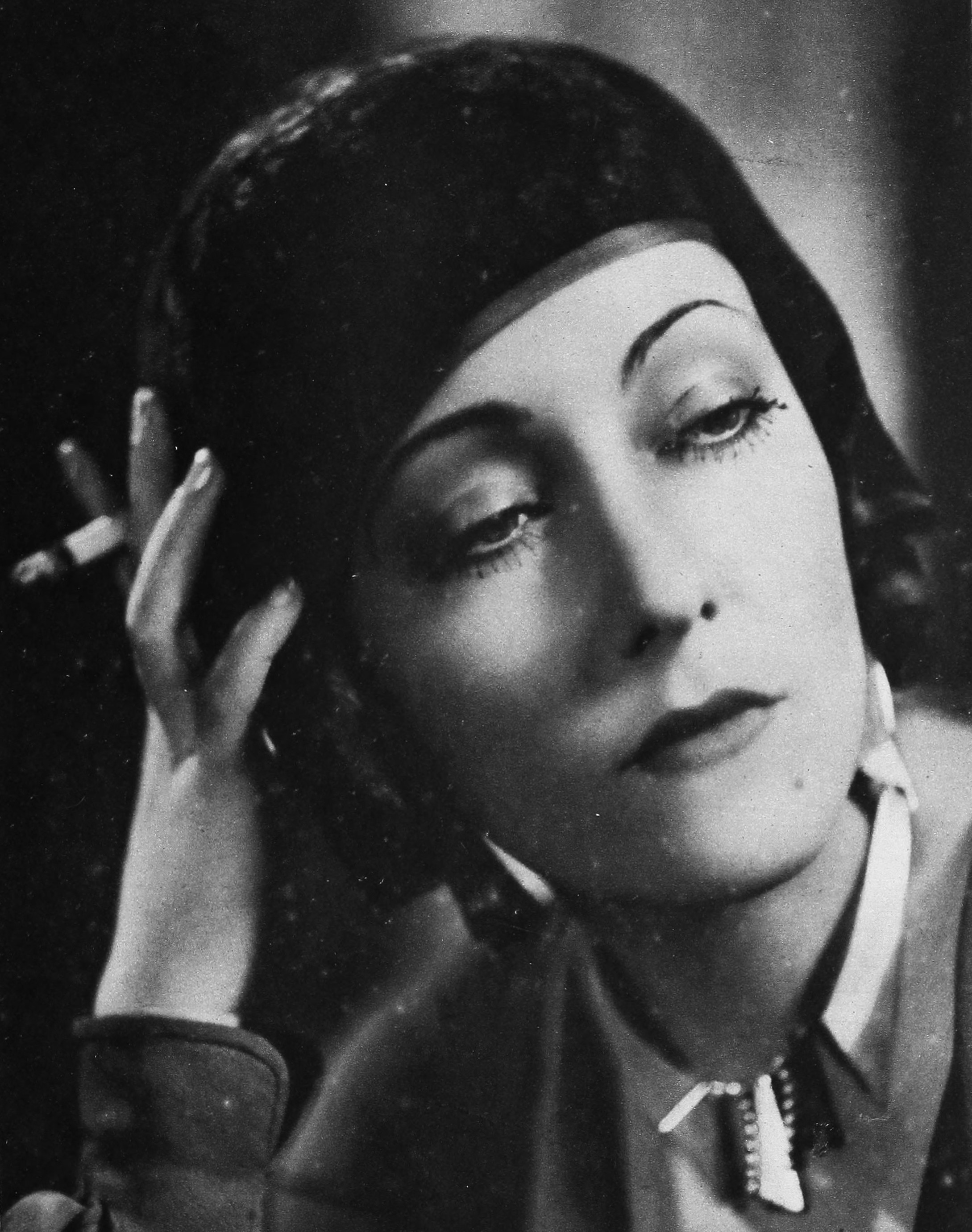
Purple - The regal color. Fire of red, spiritual range of blues: transparent, yet with the power and depth of dark tones. - Gloria Swanson

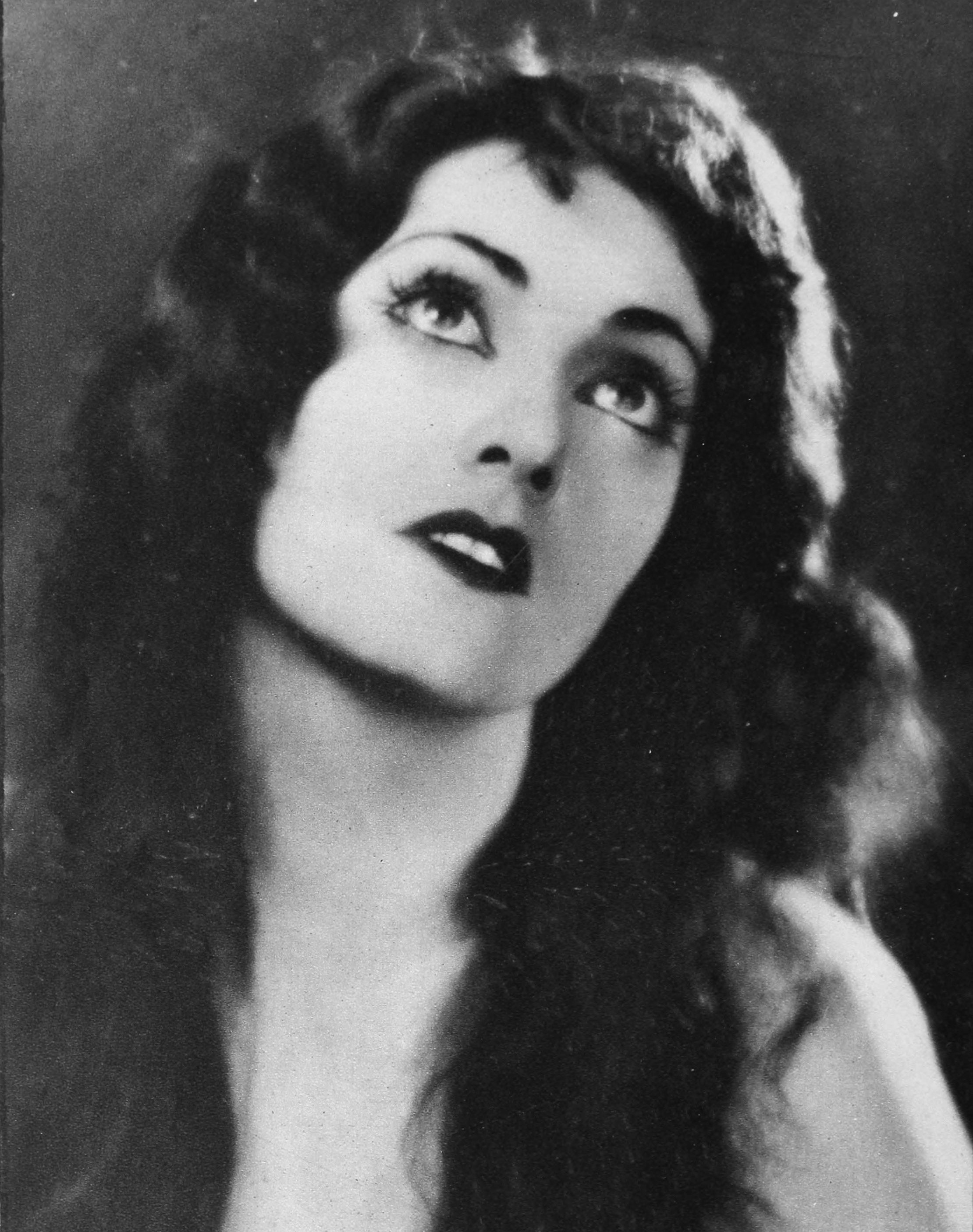
Indigo Blue - Mysterious, oriental, dramatic, exotic. - Eve Southern

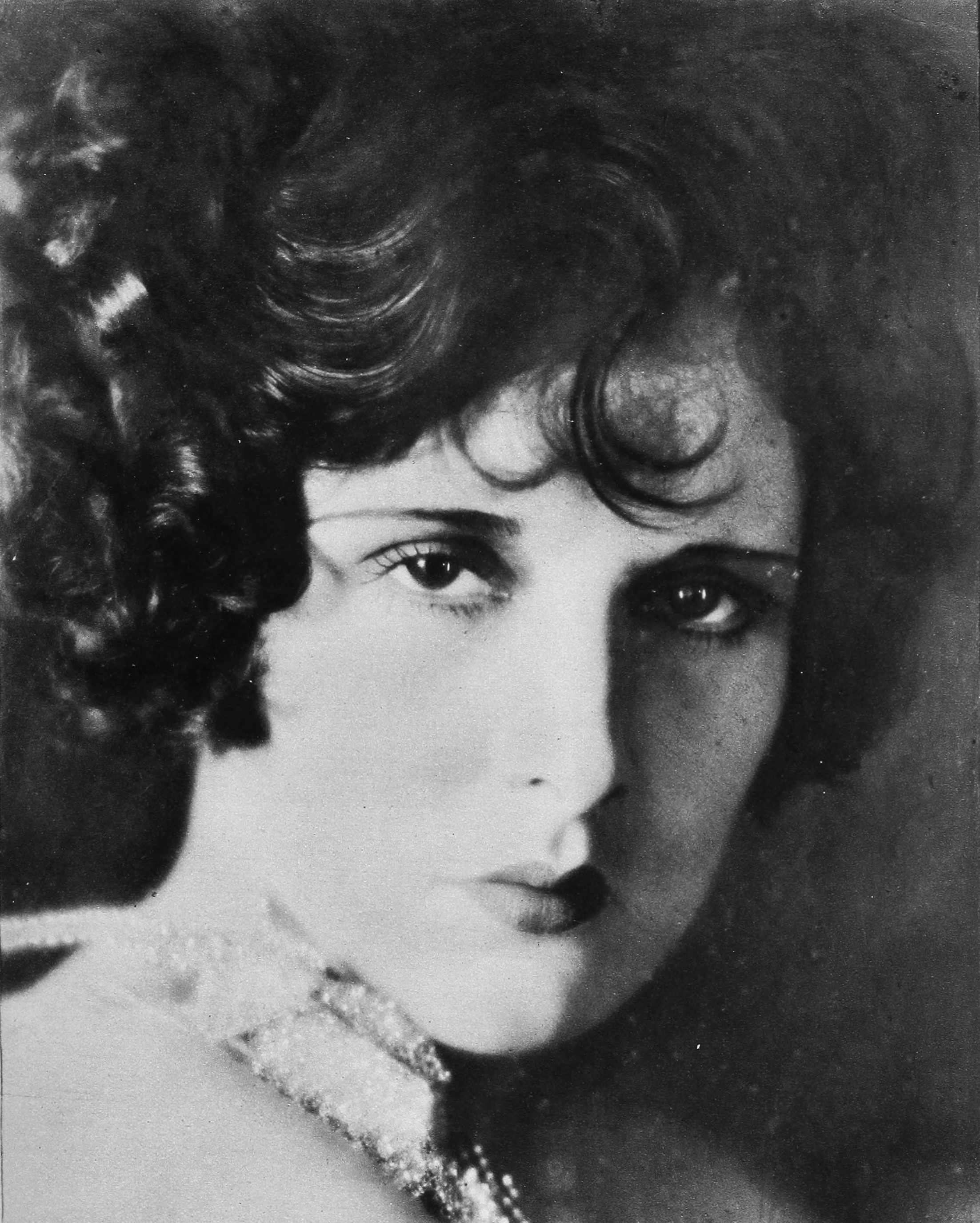
Vandyke Brown - The tone of Rembrandt shadows—deep, remote, warm. - Evelyn Brent

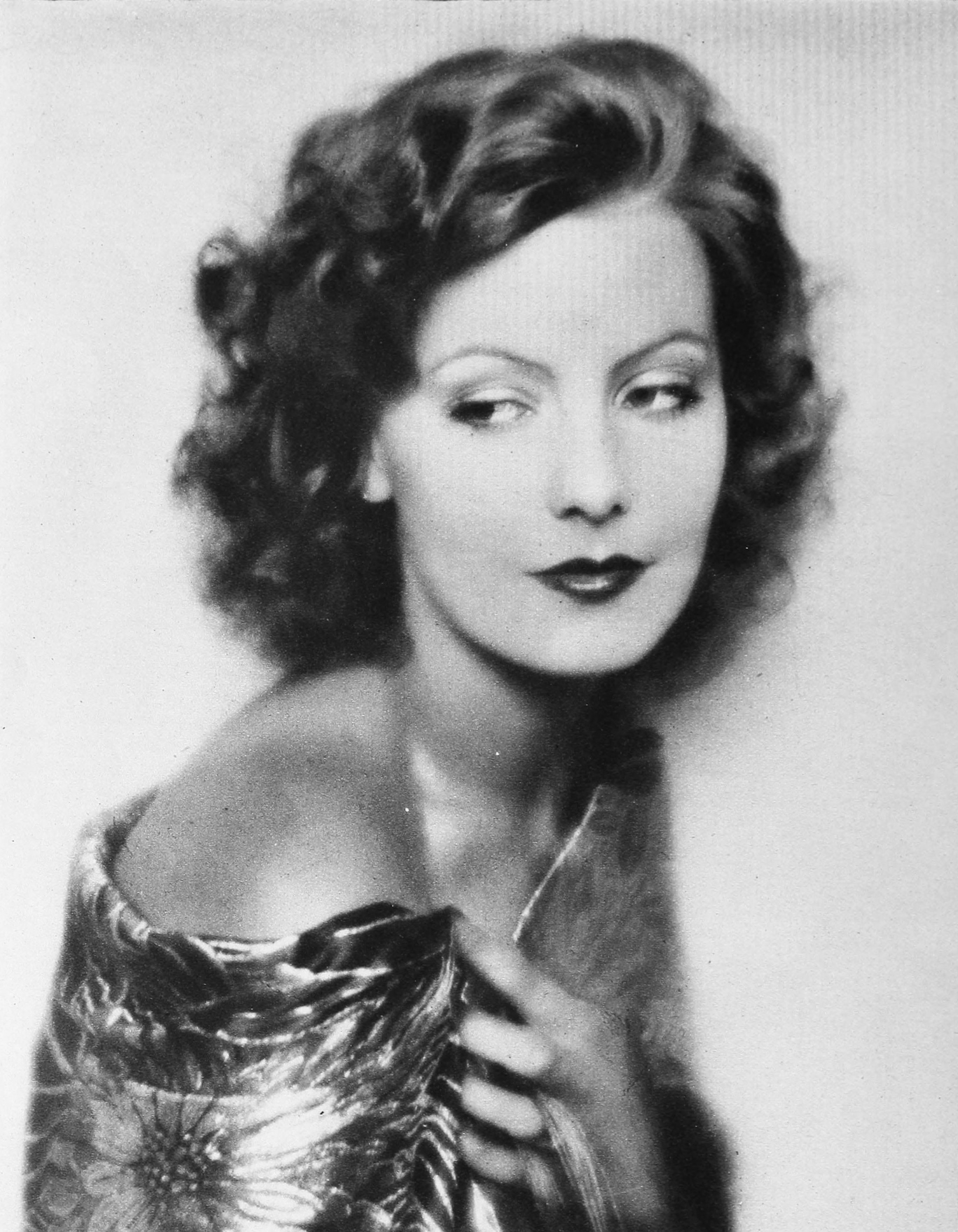
Ivory Black - Impenetrable, sombre, yet capable of innumerable variations of beauty. - Greta Garbo

== See also ==
- Pin-up girl
- List of pinup artists
