= Jewel Flowers =

American pin-up model

Jewel Flowers Evans
- Born: Jewel Flowers; July 7, 1923; East Lumberton, North Carolina
- Died: February 6, 2006 (aged 82); Myrtle Beach, South Carolina
- Occupation: Model
- Known for: Pinup calendar girl

Jewel Flowers Evans (7 July 1923 – 6 February 2006) was an American pin-up model best known for her work with Rolf Armstrong as a "Calendar Girl" during the 1940s and 1950s.

Jewel Flowers was born in 1923, in East Lumberton, North Carolina, in the part of the town known as a cotton mill village, to Calton and Leah Flowers. She was the youngest of three children. She had a sister, Evelyn Flowers, and a brother, C.F. Flowers. As a teenager, she was crowned "Miss Lumberton, North Carolina". She moved to New York City at 17 after graduating from high school, having been both invited there by a friend from Lumberton and sent by her parents to enroll in a business college in Manhattan.

In March 1940, Flowers sent a picture of herself to pin-up artist Rolf Armstrong in response to an advert he had placed in The New York Times. Armstrong, 50 at the time, had been based at the Hotel des Artistes on West 67th Street in Manhattan since 1939, and was looking for new models. He invited Flowers for an interview. On March 25, 1940, Flowers started modeling for Armstrong. Their professional collaboration and friendship lasted for two decades. The first painting, titled "How am I doing?", reportedly because Flowers, unused to modeling, repeatedly asked Armstrong "How am I doing?" during the modeling session, was first published after World War II had started. It was Brown & Bigelow's best-selling calendar for 1942 at a time when the company sold millions of calendars in the United States, and it became one of Armstrong's most reproduced pictures. Flowers was popular with American servicemen during World War II, some of whom sent her letters proposing marriage. Armstrong's calendars and silhouettes of Flowers were copied onto bombers and other planes as nose art and painted on tank turrets. She became so well known during the war, although more as a famous face than by name, that a serviceman's letter addressed as "Jewel Flowers, New York City" was delivered correctly. For many American servicemen abroad, she represented the "Why We Fight" spirit. U.S. President Franklin D. Roosevelt's government enlisted her to help promote war bonds. The January 1, 1945, edition of Time magazine included Armstrong's "Toast of the Town" painting of Flowers in an article about calendar art. The article noted that calendars with "girl paintings" were "bought heavily by foundries, machine shops, auto-supply dealers."

Flowers married Frank Welch in California in 1946. They lived in several places while her husband tried several business ventures, including Laguna Beach, California, Greenville, South Carolina, Reno, Nevada, where she reportedly worked as a card dealer for a time, and New York City. They had a son together, Woody Welch. According to Michael Wooldridge, coauthor of Pinup Dreams: The Glamour Art of Rolf Armstrong, Armstrong called her several times during the period she was following her husband from place to place, to try to persuade her to return to New York and modeling for him.

Flowers' modeling career ended with Armstrong's death in 1960, who left a large proportion of his personal wealth to her. In total, Armstrong created 50–60 works with Flowers as the model. She returned to Lumberton a wealthy woman. Her marriage to Frank Welch ended in divorce, and in 1961, she moved to Myrtle Beach, South Carolina. She married Jon Wesley Evans there in 1965. They worked together at his Certified Public Accounting firm and were successful in real estate investment. Jon Evans died in 1995.

Flowers died in 2006 of complications following surgery. Louis K. Meisel, coauthor of The Great American Pin-Up, said she was "the last of the great models" drawn by illustrators. South Carolina's The State newspaper described her as "probably the number one pin-up girl of all time".
