= Rushmere =

Rushmere may refer to:

== Places ==
- Rushmere, Bedfordshire, a location in England
- Rushmere, Hampshire, a location in England
- Rushmere, Ipswich, part of Ipswich, Suffolk, England
  - Rushmere Ward, Ipswich
- Rushmere, north Suffolk, a village near Lowestoft, Suffolk, England
- Rushmere St Andrew, a village and civil parish near Ipswich in Suffolk, England
- Rushmere, Virginia, a village in the United States
- Rushmere Country Park

== People ==
- Colin Rushmere, South African cricketer and conservationist
- John Rushmere, South African architect, cricketer and rugby union player (brother of Colin)
- Mark Rushmere, South African cricketer (son of Colin)

== Music ==
- Rushmere (album), a 2025 album by Mumford & Sons
- "Rushmere" (song), by Mumford & Sons, 2025 lead track from album above.

== See also ==
- Rushmore (disambiguation)
