= Robert Harrison (publisher) =

American journalist and publisher

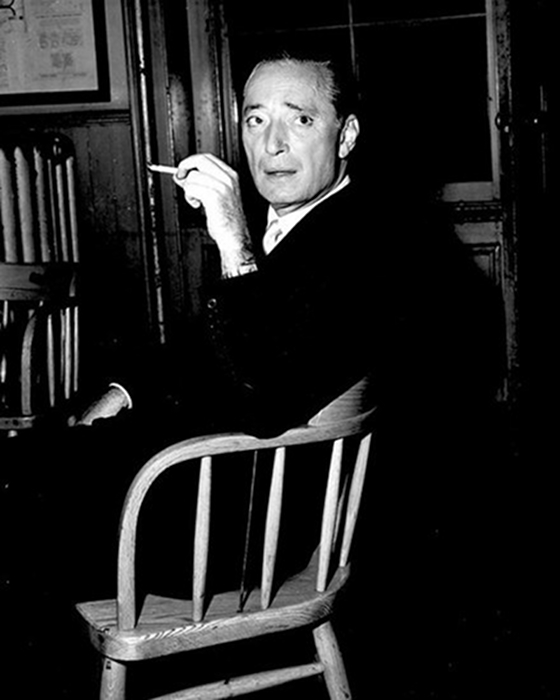
- Harrison in 1957
- Born: Max Harrison; April 14, 1904; New York City, U.S.
- Died: February 17, 1978 (aged 73); New York City, U.S.
- Other name: "Broadway Bob"
- Education: Columbia University
- Occupations: Journalist, publisher
- Years active: 1916–1978
- Political party: Republican

Robert Harrison (April 14, 1904 – February 17, 1978) was an American journalist and publisher, best known for founding and publishing sensationalist and scandal-focused magazines in the mid-20th century. He worked for the New York Evening Graphic and the Motion Picture Herald. He gained notoriety for creating Confidential, a tabloid-style magazine launched in 1952, which became infamous for its exposés on celebrities, politicians, and public figures.

Harrison's publishing style, which combined gossip, scandal, and investigative journalism, pushed the boundaries of privacy laws and defamation cases, leading to numerous legal battles. Despite its controversial nature, Confidential was highly successful, influencing the development of modern tabloid journalism and setting the stage for future celebrity gossip publications.

Following increased legal pressure and shifting public attitudes, Harrison's influence waned by the 1960s, and Confidential eventually ceased publication. However, his work left a lasting impact on sensationalist media and tabloid culture in the United States.

== Early life ==
Born Max Harrison, the youngest child and only son of Benjamin Harrison (February 1868 – 1933) and Pauline (née Israelowitz) Harrison (July 1870 – June 1939), Lithuanian Jewish immigrants from then the Russian Empire. Max grew up in New York City, first in lower Manhattan and later the Bronx, with three sisters, who doted on "the baby" of the family. As a young child, Max decided to replace his birth name with "Robert." Early on, Robert appeared magnanimous, if only due to a tendency to quickly forget slights as he could be not bothered to focus on the negative. In school he did poorly at math but well at English. He wanted to write for a living. At the age of 12, he authored and published a travel guide to roadside inns, Harrison's Weekend Guide. After the printer refused to give Harrison his share of the profits, Harrison formed a belief that one could only trust family members, whom he would later employ in various publishing projects. But years later, his generous nature would lead him to make an exception at the height of his success with an ex-McCarthyite editor with deadly repercussions.

As a teen, Harrison attended Stuyvesant High School for two years before dropping out. He would later attend night classes at Columbia University.

== Journalist ==
During the 1920s Harrison began his journalistic career as a copy boy for Bernarr McFadden's New York Evening Graphic, an ancestor of the supermarket tabloids that would emerge in the 1960s. Called the "Pornographic" by detractors for its emphasis on sex, crime and violence, it would provide many of the themes that Harrison would use as a publisher. Among his coworkers were a sportswriter, Ed Sullivan, and a crime reporter, Samuel Fuller. Harrison also met his future hero and mentor, Walter Winchell. At the Graphic, Harrison worked his way up to advertising space salesman. But before the paper failed in 1932, Harrison worked eight months as a reporter. One of his first stories was about a Ziegfeld Follies showgirl clad only in balloons. After the Graphic shutdown, Harrison sold song lyrics and returned to writing travel guides (for Cook's). His father, Benjamin Harrison, was a working-class coppersmith who scoffed at what he called "air business"—advertising and journalism—he wanted his son to become a carpenter. But Robert persisted after his father's death in 1933. In 1935 Harrison joined the editorial staff of the Motion Picture Herald, a film trade publication whose conservative Catholic owner, Martin Quigley, Sr., had close ties to the Hays Office. Quigley would himself author the decency guidelines with Jesuit Daniel A. Lord that became known as the "Hays Code." In 1935, Quigley sent Harrison to the Hollywood offices of Quigley Publishing. There Harrison collected publicity photos of would-be actresses sent by agents. While in Hollywood, the idea of a magazine began to form.

== Publisher ==
=== Beauty Parade ===
Harrison returned to New York City. Having learned from Quigley what he could get away with legally, Harrison struck out on his own with a series of non-pornographic "cheesecake" magazines. His first was Beauty Parade (1941–1956), started in October 1941. It contained, as its subtitle suggests ("The World's Loveliest Girls"), pictures of attractive models who had the "girl-next-door" look. Beauty Parade also began the photo-story format that would be repeated by other Harrison publications. Using the facilities of Quigley Publishing surreptitiously at night, Harrison used the photos from his Hollywood visit to paste together his galleries. When he was caught and fired on Christmas Eve, 1941, his sisters Edith and Helen rallied around him and raised several thousand dollars in capital, $400 of it from his favorite niece, Marjorie, who would later become a central figure in his most famous enterprise.

=== Eyeful ===
Harrison's next magazine, Eyeful (1942–1955), was similar to Beauty Parade. The depicted women were still fully, or partially, clothed but were placed in more intimate positions. The models still had the girl-next-door look ("Glorifying the American Girl") and would feature a Wall Street secretary, Bettie Page, then supplementing her income for acting lessons. During this period Harrison hired Edythe Farrell from the National Police Gazette. Farrell, a psychology major from Hunter College, "introduced her new boss to Krafft-Ebing's Psychopathia Sexualis and the idea that whips and chains and spike heels would sell." Titter (1943–1955), which focused on sadomasochist themes—with women in bondage, handling whips or being spanked—began Harrison's move from "wholesome" looking models. Wink (1944–1955) also featured sadomasochist imagery, but contained a stronger element of fetishism. After World War II, Harrison created Flirt (1947–1955), which mainly featured fetishist photo-stories. Harrison was not beyond posing himself with the models, "playing everything from pith-helmeted white slaver to wife spanker." To enhance sales he used three leading Petty Girl-like artists of the day to do the covers: Peter Driben, Earl Moran (AKA Steffa) and Billy De Vorss.

=== Whisper ===
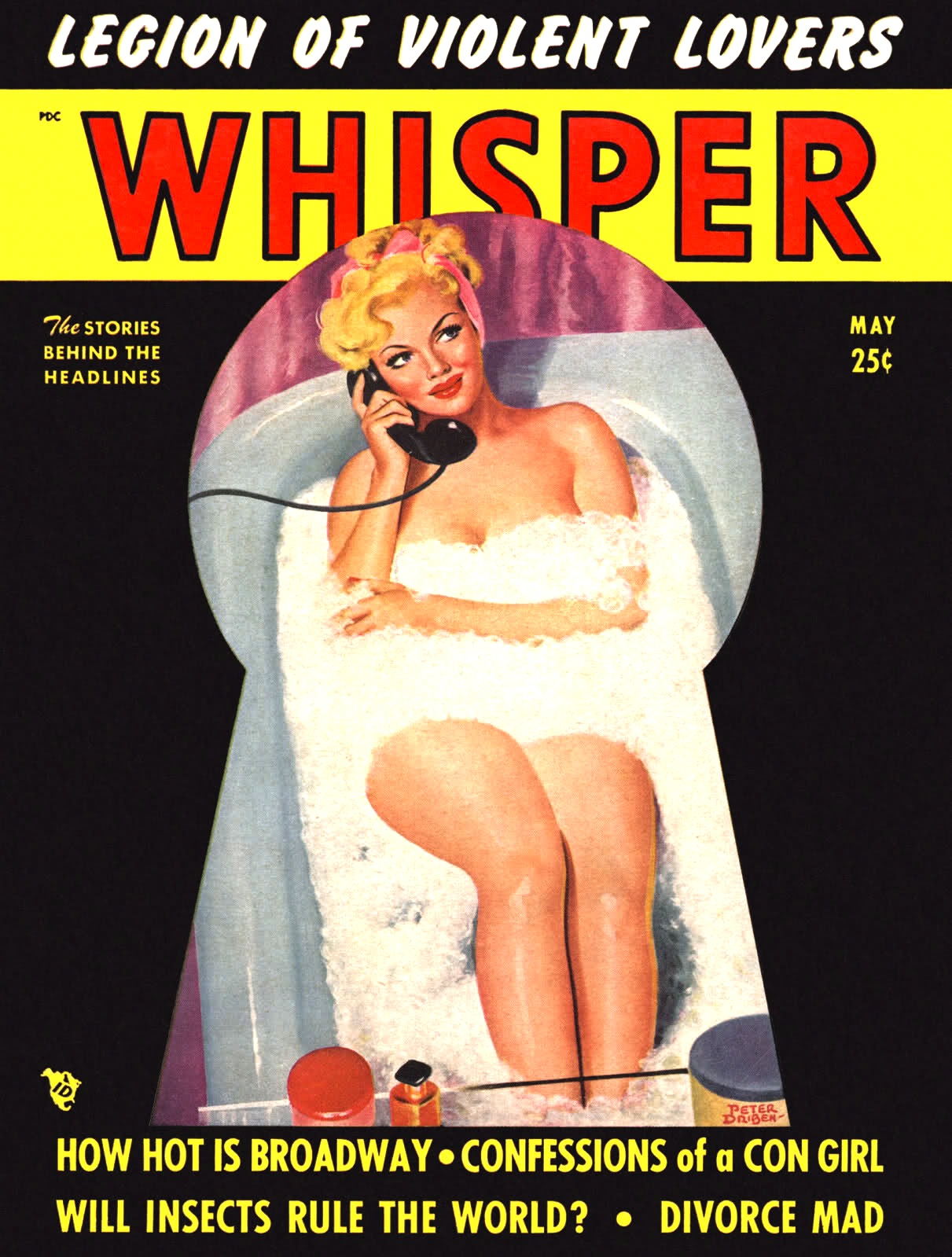
Whisper, May 1950

The one Harrison men's magazine that differed from the Beauty Parade format was Whisper, started in April 1946. It began as a clone of Beauty Parade, but became more explicit, violent and blatantly sexual. In 1953, Harrison was arrested for staging a Whisper photo shoot at a New Jersey golf course. It starred Page as a prisoner being tortured by models dressed in skimpy Ku Klux Klan-like costumes. But the old format of suggested nudity and sex was not working in the 1950s as it did in the '40s. During the heyday of his cheesecake magazines, Harrison moved with his sister Helen from their two-bedroom apartment into a nine-bedroom suite at the Parc Vendôme. Harrison became a fixture on the New York nightclub scene and was portrayed as a playboy in society columns. He indulged in his trademark proclivity toward all things white—Cadillacs, tailored suits from Sulka (Amos Sulka & Company, a defunct maker of men's wear), cashmere polo coats and hats. He was often photographed in the company of Broadway or Hollywood starlets. But the circulation of his magazines declined in the post-war years. By early 1952 his accountant told him that he was broke. In addition to rival imitators, Harrison "could not compete with the new celebrity focused men's magazine, Playboy, whose first issue, released in 1953, featured a full color centerfold of Marilyn Monroe." But Harrison had an aversion to real nudity and never went the route of Playboy. Instead, he returned to his New York Graphic roots. Thus, Whisper would morph a third time in the 1950s to imitate the most audacious of Harrison's periodicals.

=== Confidential ===
==== Origins ====
Back in 1947, Harrison "mocked up a 'fact' magazine called Eyewitness," which was never published. Then in 1952, Harrison spent six months reworking the format of a new, similar magazine. He would later say: "I must have ripped that thing apart three times before I published it, and it still wasn't right." Supposedly inspired by Virginia Hill's testimony to the Kefauver Committee hearings, Harrison launched his tabloid-style gossip magazine: Confidential. As with the earlier New York Graphic, it concentrated on exposing the substance abuse habits, criminal records and hidden political and sexual preferences of celebrities. For example, the magazine alleged that June Allyson had extramarital affairs ("How Long Can Dick Powell Take It?"), that Johnnie Ray was a "drag queen" ("Is It True What They Say About Johnnie Ray?") and that Robert Mitchum was an exhibitionist ("Robert Mitchum...the Nude Who came to Dinner!") Apart from spreading gossip, Confidential combined the exposés with a conservative agenda especially targeted at those who sympathized with the left wing and in identifying those engaged in "miscegenation."

"The Confidential house style was laden with elaborate, pun-inflected alliteration and allowed stories to suggest, rather than state, the existence of scandal." But if Harrison had sworn affidavits or photographic/audio proof, the story would go beyond innuendo. Film historian Mary Desjardins described Confidential's editorial style as using "research methods and writing techniques that recycled old stories or created 'composite' facts as the basis of new ones." Robert Harrison himself described it thus: "Once we establish the star in the hay and that's documented, we can say anything we want and I think we make them a hell of a lot more interesting than they really are. What's a guy gonna do, sue us and admit he was in the hay with the dame, but claim he didn't do all the other things we dress the story with?" After the "facts" of an article were assembled, a staff of four would rewrite it several times to achieve Confidential's "toboggan ride" style: "racy and free of embroidery, keeps the reader on the edge of his seat." The final product would be read aloud at a staff meeting for euphony.

The first Confidential issue was dated December (released November) 1952 under the caption "The Lid Is Off!" Its circulation was 250,000 copies. But when the breakup of Marilyn Monroe's marriage to Joe DiMaggio was reported in the August 1953 issue ("Why Joe DiMaggio Is Striking Out with Marilyn Monroe!"), the circulation jumped to 800,000. The quarterly magazine then became bimonthly and was the fastest growing magazine in the U.S. at the time. Harrison would claim its circulation reached four million, and because every copy was estimated to be read by ten persons, it might have reached a fifth of the U.S. population.

When Harrison published "Winchell Was Right About Josephine Baker!", he came out in support of his childhood mentor at the Graphic during the Stork Club controversy. Winchell returned the favor by mentioning Confidential in his newspaper column and radio broadcasts. Though Harrison would publish non-show business stories involving "racketeering, consumer scams and politicians' peccadilloes," like Quigley Publishing that he previously worked for, the emphasis was Hollywood, but with a twist—"exposés of star secrets" became Confidential's prime focus.

==== Rise to fame ====
Harrison would rent 4,000 square feet of office space at 1697 Broadway in New York City, but never had more than 15 staff members, mostly family relations of whom the most important were his sisters Edith and Helen. He would also move into an even more luxurious apartment at the Hotel Madison cooperative on East 58th Street. From his two new headquarters, Harrison developed a Hollywood network of informants—prostitutes, hotel employees, down-on-their-luck actors and vengeful celebrities—working with local detective agencies like the Fred Otash Detective Bureau and H. L. Von Wittenburg's Hollywood Detective Agency. Among the informants were minor actresses like Francesca De Scaffa (ex-wife of Bruce Cabot) and Ronnie Quillan (ex-wife of screenwriter Joseph Quillan). According to Harrison, Barbara Payton would stop by Confidential's Hollywood office and sell a story whenever she was short of cash. However, the informants could rise to the level of prominent Hollywood columnists like Florabel Muir and in some cases, all the way up to a producer like Mike Todd or even a studio head like Harry Cohn. Money, publicity, revenge or blackmail was the lure.

Harrison soon started making approximately half a million dollars per issue. By 1955, Confidential had reached five million copies per issue with a larger circulation than Reader's Digest, Ladies' Home Journal, Look, The Saturday Evening Post or Collier's. That year Harrison shut down all his men's magazines except Beauty Parade and Whisper. Beauty Parade would cease the next year and Whisper would continue as Confidential's sister publication, which recycled variants of Confidential's stories.

==== Rushmore ====
A film reviewer for the communist Daily Worker, Howard Rushmore was fired for a too favorable review of Gone With The Wind. He moved to the New York Journal-American and became a professional anticommunist. He later became director of research for Senator Joseph McCarthy's Subcommittee on Investigations in 1953. After a dispute with the subcommittee's chief counsel, Roy Cohn, Rushmore resigned. At the Journal-American, Rushmore criticized Cohn in print and was fired from the paper. Then his mentor, Walter Winchell, got him a new editorial job. Under Winchell's sponsorship, Howard Rushmore became the chief editor of Confidential.

Rushmore, having earned the enmity of McCarthyite papers like those of the Hearst chain, found himself cut off from his usual employment. Rushmore hoped to use Confidential as a new venue to expose communists, though he often had to settle for suspected Hollywood "fellow travellers," whom were implied in stories to be sexual "deviates." While his anti-communist hit pieces were bylined under his own name, he used a host of pseudonyms for Hollywood exposés, such as "Juan Morales" for "The Lavender Skeletons in TV's Closet" and "Hollywood—Where Men Are Men, and Women, Too!", or "Brooks Martin" for the Zsa Zsa Gabor story "Don't Be Fooled by the Glamour Pusses." Beside Rushmore-authored pieces unmasking communists and homosexuals in Washington and Hollywood, he also wrote how-to articles on divorce and conducting extra-marital affairs, echoing his past relationships with his two wives.

In January 1955, Rushmore flew to Los Angeles to confer with old Harrison informants like De Scaffa and Quillan. He also recruited new ones like Mike Connolly of The Hollywood Reporter and Agnes Underwood of the Los Angeles Herald Express. One of Rushmore's most prolific discoveries was United Press columnist Aline Mosby. Despite his high salary, Rushmore was repelled by the informants and Harrison. Rushmore considered his employer a "pornographer," though Rushmore himself was a collector of erotica. Contrary to the popular legend that the magazine double-checked its facts before publishing its articles, as well as being vetted by Confidential's lawyers as "suit-proof," the later 1957 court case would show otherwise. Harrison communicated with his West Coast network by telegram and phone. But in the rising face of legal threats from the film industry, Harrison would make his boldest move yet.

Hollywood Research Inc. was the new intelligence-gathering front of Confidential, run by Marjorie Meade, Robert Harrison's now 26-year-old niece. Despite her youth and red-headed beauty, she was one of the most feared persons in Hollywood since her arrival in January 1955. John Mitchum, the younger brother of Robert Mitchum, described a visit to Fred Otash, where he was taken to "a ground floor apartment in a luxury apartment building in Beverley Hills [sic], the offices, it turned out, of Hollywood Research Inc., command central for Confidential's fact-gathering and surveillance agents. The place was filled with big, tough looking guys, and some of them looked like they were packing heat. There were desks around the apartment topped with phones and recording and listening devices and files and photographs. John was taken to the head tough guy and recognized him—it was Fred Otash, a notorious ex-LA cop turned private eye, Hollywood fixer, problem solver, leg breaker, a big mean Lebanese, looked like Joe McCarthy with muscle." The Harrison enterprise had evolved into a "quasi-blackmail operation." Once a proposed story was assembled, it could be published outright. Or more typically, either Meade or an agent would visit the subject and present a copy as a "buy-back" proposal, or the story be held back for in exchange for information on other celebrities. But instead of paying the magazine not to publish an article about themselves or implicating others, two actors, Lizabeth Scott and Robert Mitchum, sued. Their attorney was Jerry Giesler, who also represented heiress Doris Duke.

==== Two hoaxes ====
On July 8, 1955, Rushmore appeared on The Tom Duggan Show in Chicago. He claimed on air that he was on a secret mission to uncover the communist assassins of former Secretary of Defense James Forrestal. Rushmore told the viewers that the leader of the "Chicago Communist Party," whose name was given as "Lazarovich," was in hiding and that Rushmore needed their help in locating him. Rushmore later disappeared from his hotel room, leading to a nationwide manhunt by the FBI. As the nation speculated that Rushmore was either kidnapped or murdered by communists, he was discovered hiding under the name "H. Roberts" at the Hotel Finlen in Butte, Montana. Meanwhile, news reporters found "Lazarovich" living in Manhattan under his real name of William Lazar. Associate Director of the FBI, Clyde Tolson, wrote in the margin of a report on the disappearance: "Rushmore must be a 'nut.' We should have nothing to do with him." J. Edgar Hoover added in the margin: "I certainly agree."

Rushmore's second marriage was deteriorating. In addition to Rushmore's amphetamine habit, he became an alcoholic as did his wife. On Monday, September 5, 1955, Frances Rushmore jumped into the East River in a suicide attempt, but was rescued by an air terminal worker. Meanwhile, Rushmore tried to get Harrison to publish a story about former First Lady Eleanor Roosevelt having an alleged affair with her African American chauffeur. When Harrison refused, Rushmore quit. By early February 1956, Rushmore was reportedly an editor at the National Police Gazette.

The next spring, despite Giesler's reassurances to the press, the legal effort against Confidential would go nowhere. Since the magazine was domiciled in New York State, and the plaintiffs were California residents who initiated the suits in their own state, the suits were stopped. On March 7, 1956, Los Angeles Supreme Court judge Leon T. David quashed Lizabeth Scott's suit on grounds that the magazine was not published in California. Despite this setback, in addition to Scott's suit, "Giesler said he also would refile in New York a $2 million suit by actor Robert Mitchum against the magazine if it also is quashed here." Though Giesler's initial attack failed, lawsuits from other actors continued to pile up—they would eventually total $40 million.

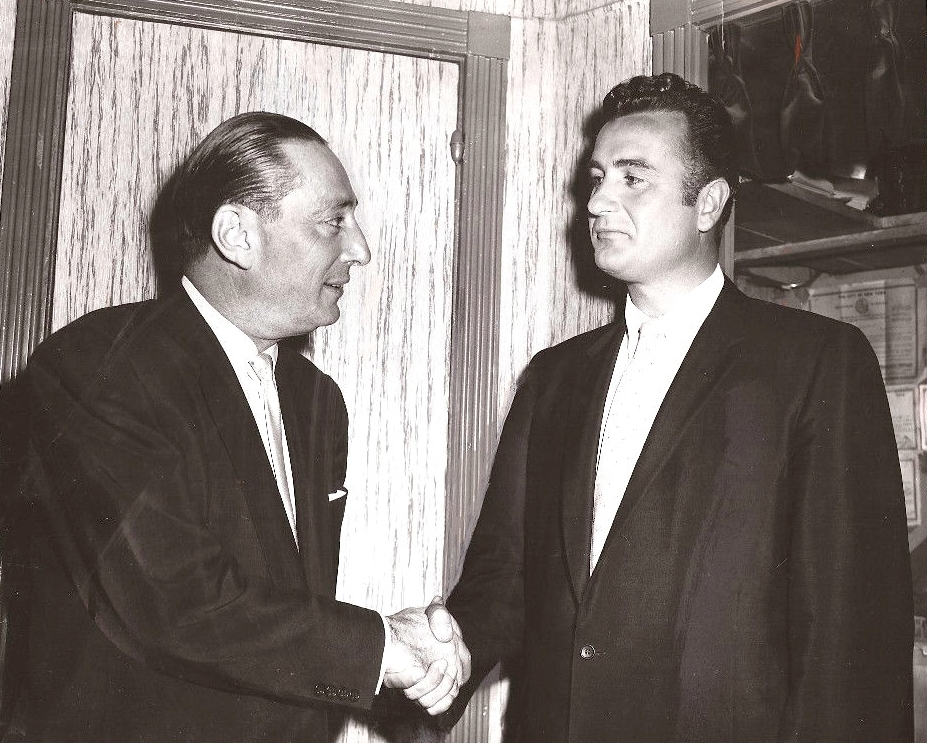
Robert Harrison and Richard Weldy, 1956

In September 1956, Harrison generated front-page headlines around the world when he allegedly was shot in the shoulder during a safari in the Dominican Republic by Richard Weldy, a travel agency owner and former executive for Pan American Grace Airways. Weldy, variously described as a "jungle trapper and guide" or "a big game hunter," purportedly harbored a grudge over a Confidential story about his ex-wife, Pilar Pallete, a Peruvian actress who was then married to John Wayne. The nonexistent Confidential article depicted Pallete as having an affair with Wayne while married to Weldy. According to newspaper accounts, Weldy fled the scene, leaving Harrison to die alone in the jungle with his blonde girlfriend; the two were eventually rescued by the Dominican Army. Weldy was later arrested by police. But Harrison refused to press charges against Weldy and the two publicly reconciled. Later the whole story was revealed to be a hoax—the shooting never took place. Photos of a wounded Harrison in a hospital were staged. Even the "girlfriend" was an actress that Harrison hired for the publicity stunt. During a television interview with Mike Wallace, Harrison fooled the CBS film crew into thinking that a birthmark on his back was the bullet wound.

==== 1957 mistrial ====
Back in New York, Rushmore used his severance pay from Confidential to buy an air ticket to California, where he contacted Giesler's office. Rushmore offered to become a witness in exchange for a job in Hollywood, but Giesler refused. Then Rushmore became a witness for California Attorney General Edmund "Pat" Brown. Since Confidential was ensconced in New York state, and New York refused to let Brown extradite Harrison to California, Brown instead put Hollywood Research and Harrison's niece Marjorie and her husband, Fred Meade, on trial. The Meades were actually in New York City at the time of the grand jury indictments and originally intended not to participate in the California trial—libel was not an extraditable offense under New York State law. But Harrison, seeing an opportunity of a lifetime for front-page headlines, wanted to avoid a trial in absentia and encouraged the Meades to return to Los Angeles with defense attorney Arthur Crowley to pleaded their case. Crowley's strategy was simple: put subjects of Confidential's stories on the witness stand and ask them under oath if the stories were true. Film industry executives, who previously tried to convince Edmund Brown to charge Robert Harrison with conspiracy to publish criminal libel, now tried to backpedal for fear of adverse publicity from what would be "heralded by the press as the 'Trial of a Hundred Stars'." But Brown would have none of it—on August 7, 1957, The People of the State of California v. Robert Harrison et al. trial began. It would eventually involve over 200 members of the film industry, most of whom fled California to avoid defense subpoenas. Rushmore, now the state's star witness, testified that the magazine knowingly published unverified allegations, despite the magazine's reputation for double-checking facts: "Some of the stories are true and some have nothing to back them up at all. Harrison many times overruled his libel attorneys and went ahead on something." According to Rushmore, Harrison told the attorneys, "I'd go out of business if I printed the kind of stuff you guys want." Rushmore even fingered Aline Mosby, who was in the press galleries covering the trial for United Press. It was revealed that Mosby wrote upward to 24 stories for Confidential—UP had to replace the disgraced Mosby with another reporter.

During the trial, two witnesses for the defense unexpectedly died. Private detective Polly Gould was found dead in her apartment of disputed causes. She was a former investigator for Confidential and Whisper. The previous week, Mae West's alleged love interest in Confidential's "Mae West's Open Door Policy", Chalky Wright, was found dead in a bathtub before he could testify that the story was factual.

Harrison's attorneys tried to give witnesses (who were also plaintiffs in other lawsuits against Harrison) a face-saving exit with token out-of-court settlements, such as the May 1957, $10,000 settlement with Dorothy Dandridge. But three of the most prominent witnesses for the prosecution—Liberace, Errol Flynn and Maureen O'Hara—refused to settle out-of-court. But when a mistrial was declared on October 1, 1957, after two weeks of deliberations, the three witnesses would give up on their own individual lawsuits. But Edmund Brown preempted Confidential's win by calling for a retrial. Harrison was rattled. To spare his niece another ordeal—and the danger of three-years' imprisonment—Harrison promised the Attorney General to publish only positive stories.

== Later years ==
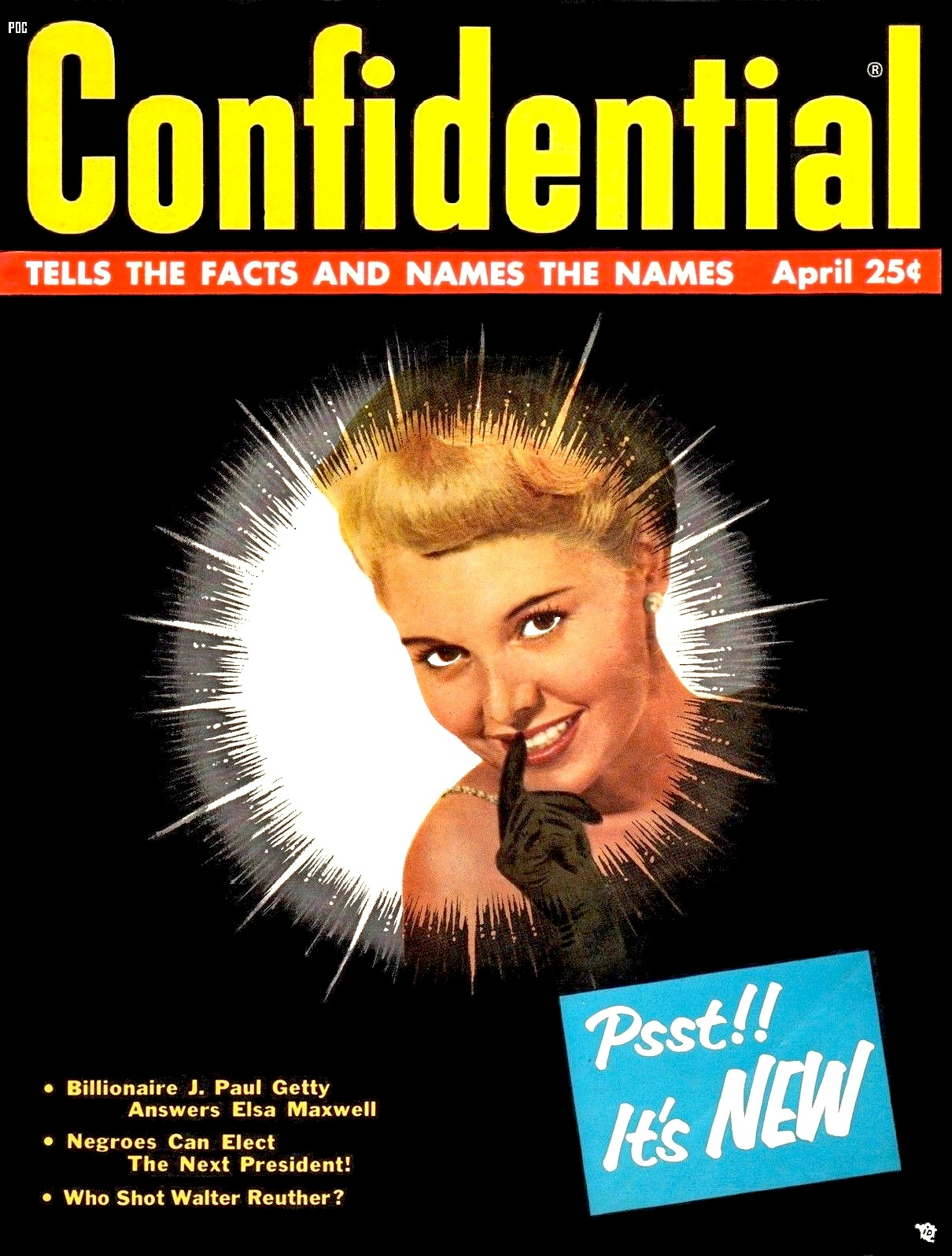
Confidential, April 1958, the last issue by Harrison

Harrison's publicity stunt backfired. The deal with Brown became the effective end of Confidential and Whisper, as the magazines were no longer able to publish their usual scandalous stories. The magazines' one and only trial cost Harrison over $500,000—in addition to legal fees of $500,000 and a $5,000 fine for each magazine, Maureen O'Hara settled out-of-court for an undisclosed sum on July 1, 1958; Errol Flynn settled on July 8, 1958 for $15,000; and on July 16, 1958, Liberace settled for $40,000, an amount that the pianist might typically exceed with one or two performances. In addition the legal fees and settlements, Harrison gave the Meades $150,000 as a gift. He was still a multimillionaire.

But the Hollywood informant network was in shambles, mainly due to Howard Rushmore's courtroom revelations. Characteristically of Harrison, he bore no ill will toward Rushmore, who by 1957 was reduced to writing occasional articles on hunting for outdoors magazines. In December 1957, Rushmore chased his wife Frances and teenaged step-daughter Lynn out of their Manhattan home with a shotgun. While Frances was under psychiatric care since the East River incident, Howard himself was now under psychiatric care. On January 3, 1958, at 6:15 pm, a few days before Frances was scheduled to lead a junket of editors to Brazil, the Rushmores met in a final attempt at a reconciliation. An argument broke out between the couple and Frances left the lobby of their apartment building and hailed a taxi. Simultaneously, Howard entered the cab. As the two continued arguing, the cab raced to the 23rd Precinct at Third and 104th. They were only two blocks away when Frances screamed, "Oh my God!" Suddenly, three gunshots fired inside the cab. Rushmore had shot his wife in the right side of the head and neck then put the pistol to his temple and shot himself. Harrison himself heard about the murder-suicide when a taxicab picked him up at Idlewild Airport. The driver told Harrison that the publisher of Confidential just killed himself and his wife, momentarily confusing the unmarried Harrison. Later Harrison refused to believe the suicide narrative and thought Howard Rushmore was murdered. He remained loyal to Rushmore even after the California trial and the Rushmores' scandalous deaths.

The rights to Whisper and Confidential were sold off in May 1958. The buyer, Hy Steirman, further toned down the content of both magazines. But Harrison remained in publishing, if only as a pastime. In 1963 he started a much smaller magazine called Inside News (in which he authored "Who Really Killed Howard Rushmore?"), as well as one-shot publications like New York Confidential. Harrison continued to live in New York City during the next two decades under an assumed name, while plotting a comeback. But lacking the financial pressures that drove Harrison to create his previous magazines, he was essentially retired, living his remaining years at the Delmonico Hotel, at 59th Street and Park Avenue." Robert Harrison died in 1978 with his long-time mistress, Regi Ruta, at his side; that same year Confidential was shut down.
