= Confidential (magazine) =

Pioneering gossip magazine

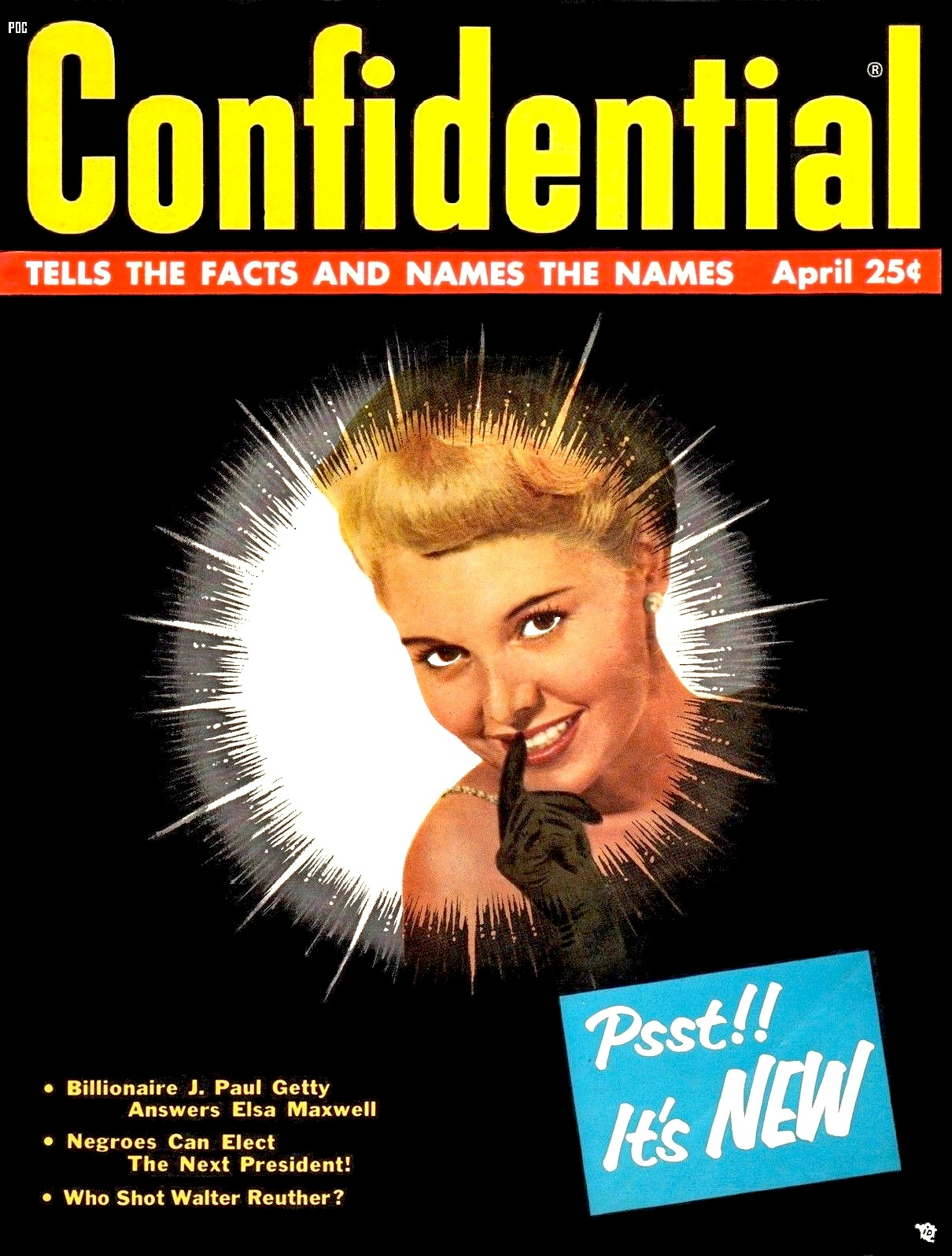
- Confidential (April 1958)
- Chief editor: Howard Rushmore (before 1958); Jay Nelson Tuck
- Managing editor: A. P. Govoni
- Associate editor: Jay Breen, Edward Gibbons
- Staff writers: Mike Connolly, Aline Mosby, Florabel Muir, Agnes Underwood
- Categories: Celebrity, investigative, consumer advocacy
- Frequency: Quarterly, then bimonthly
- Publisher: Robert Harrison (before 1958); Hy Steirman
- Total circulation: 5 million (1955)
- Founder: Robert Harrison
- Founded: 1952
- First issue: December 1952
- Final issue: 1978
- Company: Confidential Inc. (before 1958); By-Line Publications, Inc.
- Country: United States
- Based in: New York City, New York
- Language: English

Confidential was an American magazine considered a pioneer in scandal, gossip and exposé journalism. Founded by Robert Harrison, it was published quarterly from December 1952 to August 1953 and then bi-monthly until it ceased publication in 1978.

== Competitors ==
Competitors included: Whisper, Dare, Suppressed, The Hollywood Low Down, Hush-Hush, and Uncensored.

== Origins ==
=== New York Graphic ===
Following World War II, Robert Harrison, a New York City publisher of men's magazines, decided to return to investigative journalism. He was previously a reporter on the New York Evening Graphic (1924–1932), an ancestor of the supermarket tabloids that would emerge in the 1960s. Called "The Porno-Graphic" by detractors for its emphasis on sex, crime and violence, it provided many of the themes that Harrison would use as publisher of Confidential. When Harrison started as a copyboy at the paper, he met the theater critic, Walter Winchell, who would later promote the future magazine.

=== Motion Picture Herald ===
After the New York Evening Graphic shut down, Harrison moved to the editorial staff of the Motion Picture Herald, a film trade publication whose conservative Catholic owner, Martin Quigley, Sr., helped create the Motion Picture Production Code. Though Harrison was more interested in Broadway and New York social life, his tenure at the Herald would bias the direction of the future Confidential toward Hollywood.

Having learned from Quigley what he could get away with legally, Harrison struck out on his own with a series of non-pornographic "cheesecake" magazines. His first was Beauty Parade (1941–1956), started in October 1941. Using the facilities of Quigley Publishing surreptitiously at night, Harrison used publicity photos collected from a visit to the company's Hollywood offices to paste together his Galley proofs. When he was caught and fired on Christmas Eve 1941, his sisters Edith Tobias and Helen Studin rallied around him and raised several thousand dollars in capital, $400 of it from his favorite niece, Marjorie Tobias, who would later become a central figure in his most famous enterprise. Harrison had great success with Beauty Parade and five sister magazines, but their circulation declined in the post-war years. Harrison had a distaste for full nudity and refused to follow the trend of magazines such as Playboy. By early 1952 his accountant told him that he was broke.

=== Eyewitness ===
In 1947, Harrison "mocked up a 'fact' magazine called Eyewitness," which was never published. It would not be until 1952 that financial pressure forced Harrison to put serious effort in a new magazine. Harrison spent six months reworking the format of another factual magazine. He would later say: "I must have ripped that thing apart three times before I published it, and it still wasn't right." Supposedly inspired by Virginia Hill's testimony to the Kefauver Committee hearings, Harrison finally launched his tabloid-style gossip magazine: Confidential. "The name came from a series of exposé books by Lee Mortimer and Jack Lait." As with the earlier New York Graphic, it concentrated on exposing the substance abuse habits, criminal records and hidden political and sexual preferences of celebrities. Though Harrison would publish non-show business stories involving "racketeering, consumer scams and politicians' peccadilloes," like Quigley Publishing that he previously worked for, the emphasis was Hollywood, but with a twist—"exposés of star secrets" became Confidential's prime focus.

== Early years ==
=== Begins publication ===
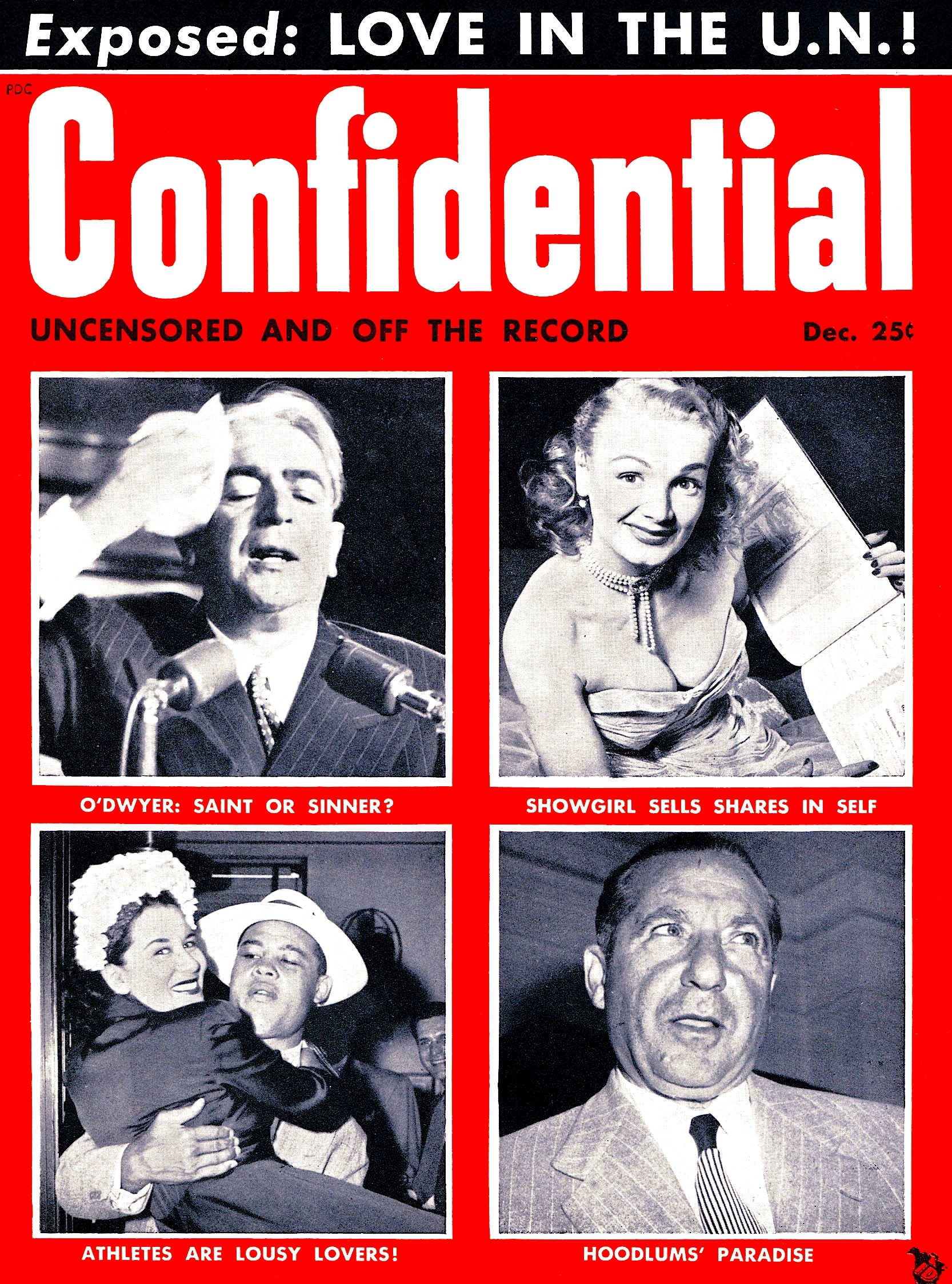
First issue of Confidential, December 1952

The first Confidential issue was dated December (released November) 1952 under the caption "The Lid Is Off!" Its circulation was 250,000 copies. But when the breakup of Marilyn Monroe's marriage to Joe DiMaggio was reported in the August 1953 issue ("Why Joe DiMaggio Is Striking Out with Marilyn Monroe!"), the circulation jumped to 800,000. The quarterly magazine then became bimonthly and was the fastest growing magazine in the United States at the time. Harrison would claim its circulation reached four million, and because every copy was estimated to be read by ten persons, it might have reached a fifth of the US population.

"The Confidential house style was laden with elaborate, pun-inflected alliteration and allowed stories to suggest, rather than state, the existence of scandal." But if Harrison had sworn affidavits or photographic/audio proof, the story would go beyond innuendo (unlike an earlier Hollywood scandal publisher, Frederic Girnau of the Coast Reporter—who was tried for libeling Clara Bow—Harrison usually protected himself with signed affidavits). Film historian Mary Desjardins described Confidential's editorial style as using "research methods and writing techniques that recycled old stories or created 'composite' facts as the basis of new ones." Robert Harrison himself described it thus: "Once we establish the star in the hay and that's documented, we can say anything we want and I think we make them a hell of a lot more interesting than they really are. What's a guy gonna do, sue us and admit he was in the hay with the dame, but claim he didn't do all the other things we dress the story with?" After the "facts" of an article were assembled, a staff of four (headed by associate editor Jay Breen) would rewrite it several times to achieve Confidential's "toboggan ride" style: "racy and free of embroidery, keeps the reader on the edge of his seat." The final product would be read aloud at a staff meeting for euphony.

When Harrison published "Winchell Was Right About Josephine Baker!", he came out in support of his childhood mentor at the Graphic during the 1951 Stork Club controversy (Josephine Baker criticized the club's unwritten policy of discouraging Black patrons, then scolded Walter Winchell, for not rising to her defense). Winchell returned the favor by mentioning Confidential in his newspaper column and television and radio broadcasts.

Harrison would rent 4,000 square feet of office space at 1697 Broadway in New York City, but never had more than 15 staff members, mostly family relations of whom the most important were his sisters Edith Tobias and Helen Studin. He would also move into an even more luxurious apartment at the Hotel Madison cooperative on East 58th Street. From his two new headquarters, Harrison developed a Hollywood network of informants—prostitutes, hotel employees, down-on-their-luck actors and vengeful celebrities—working with local detective agencies such as the Fred Otash Detective Bureau and H. L. Von Wittenburg's Hollywood Detective Agency. Among the informants were minor actresses such as Francesca De Scaffa (ex-wife of Bruce Cabot) and Ronnie Quillan (ex-wife of screenwriter Joseph Quillan). According to Harrison, Barbara Payton would stop by Confidential's Hollywood office and sell a story whenever she was short of cash. However, the informants could rise to the level of prominent Hollywood columnists such as Florabel Muir and in some cases, all the way up to a producer such as Mike Todd or even a studio head such as Harry Cohn. Money, publicity, revenge or blackmail was the lure.

Contrary to the popular legend that the magazine double-checked its facts before publishing its articles, as well as being vetted by Confidential's lawyers as "suit-proof," the later 1957 court case would show otherwise. Despite spending over $100,000 a year having a Manhattan law firm, "Becker, Ross, and Stone to vet each story," Harrison would still ignore the lawyers' warnings, as in the case of the article on Maureen O'Hara. But Harrison had further safeguards in place. In addition to articles being vetted by lawyers and sworn affidavits or photographic/audio proof of claims, Harrison compartmentalized both the printing and distribution channels. Though the editorial content was prepared in the New York offices, the magazine itself was printed in Chicago by an independent contractor (Kable Publishing of Mount Morris, Illinois). The copies were sold before they came off the presses and neither Confidential Inc. nor the printer had any corporate connection to the chain of "distributors, wholesalers and retailers that provided Confidential to all those people who claimed they only read it at the beauty parlor or the barbershop."

=== Success ===
Harrison soon started making approximately $500,000 per issue. By 1955, Confidential had reached a circulation of five million copies per issue with larger sales than Reader's Digest, Ladies' Home Journal, Look, The Saturday Evening Post, or Collier's. That year Harrison shut down all his men's magazines except Beauty Parade and Whisper. Beauty Parade would cease the next year and Whisper would continue as Confidential's sister publication, which recycled variants of Confidential's stories.

=== Rushmore ===
A former film reviewer for the communist Daily Worker, Howard Rushmore was fired for a too-favorable review of Gone With The Wind. He moved to the New York Journal-American and became an active anti-communist. He later became director of research for Senator Joseph McCarthy's Subcommittee on Investigations in 1953. After a dispute with the subcommittee's chief counsel, Roy Cohn, Rushmore resigned. At the Journal-American, Rushmore criticized Cohn in print and was fired from the paper. Then his mentor, Walter Winchell, gained for him a new editorial job. Under Winchell's sponsorship, Howard Rushmore became the chief editor of Confidential.

Rushmore provoked the enmity of newspaper editors and publishers who supported McCarthyism such as those who worked for the Hearst chain. He found himself cut off from his usual employment. Rushmore hoped to use Confidential as a new venue to expose communists, though he often had to settle for suspected Hollywood fellow travellers, who were implied in stories to be sexual "deviates." While his anti-communist hit pieces were bylined under his own name, he used a host of pseudonyms for Hollywood exposés, such as "Juan Morales" for "The Lavender Skeletons in TV's Closet" and "Hollywood—Where Men Are Men, and Women, Too!", or "Brooks Martin" for the Zsa Zsa Gabor story "Don't Be Fooled by the Glamour Pusses." Aside from Rushmore-authored pieces unmasking communists and homosexuals in Washington and Hollywood, he also wrote how-to articles on filing for divorce and conducting extra-marital affairs, echoing his experiences with his two wives.

In January 1955, Rushmore flew to Los Angeles to confer with old Harrison informants like De Scaffa and Quillan. He also recruited new ones like Mike Connolly of the Hollywood Reporter and Agnes Underwood of the Los Angeles Herald Express. One of Rushmore's most prolific discoveries was United Press columnist Aline Mosby. Despite his high salary, Rushmore was repelled by the informants and Harrison. Rushmore considered his employer a "pornographer," though Rushmore himself was a collector of erotica. Harrison communicated with his West Coast network by telegram and phone. But in the rising face of legal threats from the film industry, Harrison would make his boldest move yet.

=== Hollywood Research Inc. ===
Hollywood Research Inc. was the new intelligence-gathering front of Confidential, run by Marjorie Meade, Robert Harrison's now 26-year-old niece. Despite her youth and red-headed beauty, she was one of the most feared persons in Hollywood after her arrival in January 1955. John Mitchum, the younger brother of Robert Mitchum, tried to infiltrate Hollywood Research under the guidance of attorney Jerry Giesler. John, pretending to have scandalous information on his brother, described a visit to Fred Otash, where he was taken to "a ground floor apartment in a luxury apartment building in Beverley Hills, the offices, it turned out, of Hollywood Research Inc., command central for Confidential's fact-gathering and surveillance agents. The place was filled with big, tough looking guys, and some of them looked like they were packing heat. There were desks around the apartment topped with phones and recording and listening devices and files and photographs. John was taken to the head tough guy and recognized him—it was Fred Otash, a notorious ex-Los Angeles policeman turned private eye, Hollywood fixer, problem solver, leg breaker, a big mean Lebanese, looked like Joe McCarthy with muscle." The Harrison enterprise had evolved into a "quasi-blackmail operation." Once a proposed story was assembled, it could be published outright. Or more typically, either Meade or an agent would visit the subject and present a copy as a "buy-back" proposal, or the story be held back for in exchange for information on other celebrities. But instead of paying the magazine not to publish an article about themselves or implicating others, two actors, Lizabeth Scott and Robert Mitchum, sued. Their attorney was Jerry Giesler, who also represented tobacco heiress Doris Duke.

=== Two hoaxes ===
On July 8, 1955, Rushmore appeared on The Tom Duggan Show in Chicago. He claimed on air that he was on a secret mission to uncover the communist assassins of former Secretary of Defense James Forrestal. Rushmore told the viewers that the leader of the "Chicago Communist Party," whose name was given as "Lazarovich," was in hiding and that Rushmore needed their help in locating him. Rushmore later disappeared from his hotel room, leading to a nationwide manhunt by the FBI. As the nation speculated that Rushmore was either kidnapped or murdered by communists, he was discovered hiding under the name "H. Roberts" at the Hotel Finlen in Butte, Montana. Meanwhile, news reporters found "Lazarovich" living in Manhattan under his real name of William Lazar. Associate Director of the FBI, Clyde Tolson, wrote in the margin of a report on the disappearance: "Rushmore must be a 'nut.' We should have nothing to do with him." J. Edgar Hoover added in the margin: "I certainly agree."

Rushmore's second marriage was deteriorating. In addition to Rushmore's amphetamine habit, he became an alcoholic as did his wife. On Monday, September 5, 1955, Frances Rushmore jumped into the East River in a suicide attempt, but was rescued by an air terminal worker. Meanwhile, Rushmore tried to get Harrison to publish a story about former First Lady Eleanor Roosevelt having an alleged affair with her African American chauffeur. When Harrison refused, Rushmore quit. By early February 1956, Rushmore was reportedly an editor at the National Police Gazette.

The next spring, despite Giesler's reassurances to the press, the legal effort against Confidential would go nowhere. Since the magazine was domiciled in New York State, and the plaintiffs were California residents who initiated the suits in their own state, the suits were stopped. On March 7, 1956, Los Angeles Supreme Court judge Leon T. David quashed Lizabeth Scott's suit on grounds that the magazine was not published in California. Despite this setback, in addition to Scott's suit, "Giesler said he also would refile in New York a $2 million suit by actor Robert Mitchum against the magazine if it also is quashed here." Though Giesler's initial attack failed, lawsuits from other actors continued to pile up—they would eventually total $40 million.

In September 1956, Harrison generated front-page headlines around the world when he allegedly was shot in the shoulder during a safari in the Dominican Republic by Richard Weldy, a travel agency owner and former executive for Pan American Grace Airways. Harrison claimed to be searching for Paga Palo (Rhynchosia pyranzidalis)—a vine used to restore virility in males, which was the subject of a January 1957 Confidential article. The shooter, Weldy, variously described as a "jungle trapper and guide" or "a big game hunter," purportedly harbored a grudge over a Confidential story about his ex-wife, Pilar Pallete, a Peruvian actress who was then married to John Wayne. The nonexistent Confidential article depicted Pallete as having an affair with Wayne while married to Weldy. According to newspaper accounts, Weldy fled the scene, leaving Harrison to die alone in the jungle with his blonde girlfriend; the two were eventually rescued by either the Dominican Army or local police and boy scouts. Newspapers reported that Weldy was later arrested by police. But Harrison refused to press charges against Weldy and the two publicly reconciled. Later the whole story was revealed to be a hoax—the shooting never took place. Photos of a wounded Harrison in a hospital were staged, complete with an actor playing a physician. Even the "girlfriend" was an actress that Harrison hired for the publicity stunt. During a television interview with Mike Wallace, Harrison fooled the CBS film crew into thinking that a birthmark on his back was the bullet wound.

== Decline ==
=== 1957 California Criminal Libel Prosecution ===
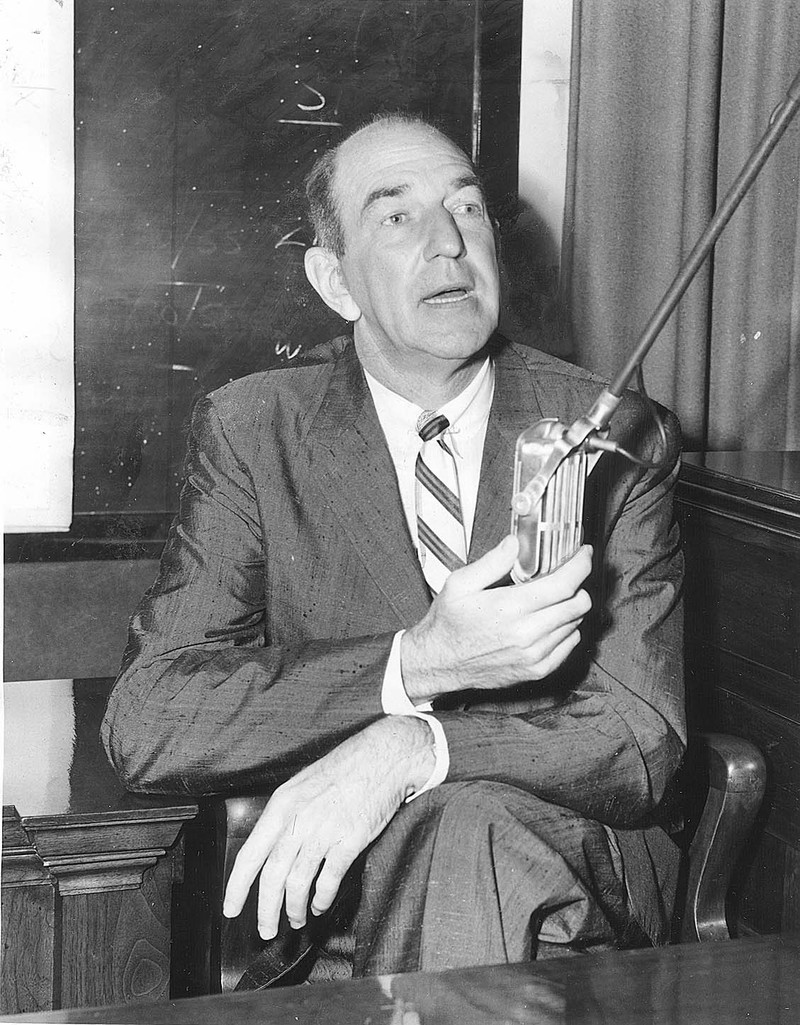
Howard Rushmore testifying at 1957 trial

The movie industry was constantly engaged in ways to suppress the stream of stories coming from Confidential. They approached a California District Attorney about prosecuting the publication for criminal libel, which was a misdemeanor in California at the time. Criminal libels trials were rare, and have since been eliminated by the courts. Confidential was charged with conspiracy to commit criminal libel, which was a felony even though the underlying crime was a misdemeanor. This distinction helped the prosecution to enforce subpoenas and extradition requests which were not available for misdemeanor charges.

Back in New York, Rushmore used his severance pay from Confidential to buy an air ticket to California, where he contacted Giesler's office. Rushmore offered to become a witness in exchange for a job in Hollywood, but Giesler refused. Then Rushmore became a witness for California Attorney General Pat Brown. On Wednesday, May 15, 1957, a Los Angeles grand jury investigating Confidential indicted 11 individuals—Robert Harrison (publisher and sole owner of Confidential Inc.), Francesca De Scaffa, Harrison's niece Marjorie Meade (president and sole owner of Hollywood Research Inc.) and her husband Fred Meade (secretary-treasurer of Hollywood Research Inc.), Harrison's sister Edith Tobias (Harrison's secretary) and her son Michael Tobias (vice-president of Hollywood Research), Harrison's sister Helen Studin (office manager of Confidential) and her husband Daniel Studin (circulation manager of Confidential), and Confidential managing editor A. P. Govani. In addition, two Illinois publishing executives, Robert Kable and Richard Cox of Kable Publishing, which printed Harrison's magazines under contract, were also indicted.

The five corporations listed in the indictments were Confidential Inc., Whisper Inc., Publishers Distributing Corp. of New York, Kable Publishing Inc. of Illinois and Hollywood Research Inc. of Los Angeles. But the magazines and main distributor were ensconced in New York state, and New York refused to let Brown extradite Harrison and the others to California. Illinois also refused to cooperate with the Attorney General. Brown eventually put Marjorie and Fred Meade on trial.

The Meades were actually in New York City at the time of the grand jury indictments and originally intended not to participate in the California trial—libel was not an extraditable offense under New York state law. But Harrison, seeing an opportunity of a lifetime for front-page headlines, wanted to avoid a trial in absentia and encouraged the Meades to return to Los Angeles with defense attorney Arthur Crowley to plead their case. Crowley's strategy was simple: put subjects of Confidential's stories on the witness stand and ask them under oath if the stories were true. Film industry executives, who previously tried to convince Pat Brown to charge Robert Harrison with conspiracy to publish criminal libel, now tried to backpedal for fear of adverse publicity from what would be "heralded by the press as the 'Trial of a Hundred Stars'." But Brown would have none of it—on August 7, 1957, The People of the State of California v. Robert Harrison et al. trial began. It would eventually involve over 200 members of the film industry, most of whom fled California to avoid defense subpoenas.

Rushmore, now the state's star witness, testified that the magazine knowingly published unverified allegations, despite the magazine's reputation for double-checking facts: "Some of the stories are true and some have nothing to back them up at all. Harrison many times overruled his libel attorneys and went ahead on something." According to Rushmore, Harrison told the attorneys, "I'd go out of business if I printed the kind of stuff you guys want." Rushmore even fingered Aline Mosby, who was in the press galleries covering the trial for the newspaper wire service called United Press. It was revealed that Mosby wrote more than 24 stories for Confidential. United Press replaced the disgraced Mosby with another reporter.

During the trial, two witnesses for the defense unexpectedly died. Private detective Polly Gould was found dead in her apartment of disputed causes. She was a former investigator for Confidential and Whisper. The previous week, Mae West's alleged love interest in Confidential's "Mae West's Open Door Policy", Chalky Wright, was found dead in a bathtub before he could testify that the story was factual.

Harrison's attorneys tried to give witnesses (who were also plaintiffs in other lawsuits against Harrison) a face-saving exit with token out-of-court settlements, such as the May 1957 $10,000 settlement with Dorothy Dandridge. After cashing Harrison's check, Dandridge testified for the prosecution anyway. Three of the most prominent witnesses for the prosecution—Liberace, Errol Flynn and Maureen O'Hara—refused to settle out-of-court. O’Hara and Dandridge were the only actors who testified, and a daily newspaper called the Los Angeles Examiner ran a photograph of them shaking hands in a hallway of the courthouse.

At the end of the trial the jury was sequestered at the five star Mayflower Hotel. The jury set a new state record in deliberation time while enjoying Mayflower's amenities. After 15 days it was declared that the jury could not reach a verdict. After a mistrial was declared on October 1, 1957, Liberace, Flynn and O'Hara would give up on their own individual lawsuits. But Pat Brown preempted Confidential's win by calling for a retrial. Harrison was rattled. To spare his niece another ordeal—and the danger of three-years' imprisonment—Harrison promised the Attorney General to publish only positive stories.

=== Later years ===
Harrison's publicity stunt backfired. The deal with Brown became the effective end of Confidential and Whisper, as the magazines were no longer able to publish their usual scandalous stories. The magazines' one and only trial cost Harrison over $500,000—in addition to legal fees of $500,000 and a $5,000 fine for each magazine, Maureen O'Hara settled out-of-court for an undisclosed sum on July 1, 1958; Errol Flynn settled on July 8, 1958 for $15,000; and on July 16, 1958, Liberace settled for $40,000, an amount that the pianist might typically exceed with one or two performances. In addition to the legal fees and settlements, Harrison gave the Meades $150,000 as a gift. Harrison was still a multimillionaire.

But the Hollywood informant network was in a shambles, mainly due to Howard Rushmore's courtroom revelations. Characteristically of Harrison, he bore no ill will toward Rushmore, who by 1957 was reduced to writing occasional articles on hunting for outdoors magazines. In December 1957, Rushmore chased his wife Frances and teenaged step-daughter Lynn out of their Manhattan home with a shotgun. While Frances was under psychiatric care since the East River incident, Howard himself was now under psychiatric care.

On January 3, 1958, at 6:15 pm, the Rushmores met in a final attempt at a reconciliation inside the lobby of their apartment building. An argument broke out between the couple and Frances exited the lobby and hailed a taxi. Simultaneously, Howard entered the cab. As the two continued arguing, the cab driver raced to the 23rd Precinct at Third and 104th. Suddenly, the driver heard three gunshots fired inside the cab. Rushmore had shot his wife in the right side of the head and neck then put the pistol to his temple and shot himself. Harrison heard about the murder-suicide when a taxicab picked him up at Idlewild Airport. The driver told Harrison that the publisher of Confidential just killed himself and his wife, momentarily confusing the unmarried Harrison. Later Harrison refused to believe the suicide narrative and thought Howard Rushmore was murdered. He remained loyal to Rushmore even after the California trial and the Rushmores' scandalous deaths.

The once biggest-selling magazine in the United States plunged to a circulation of 200,000, smaller than its December 1952 début. The rights to Whisper and Confidential were sold off in May 1958 for $25,000. The buyer, Hy Steirman, further toned down the content of both magazines. But Harrison remained in publishing. In 1963 he started a much smaller magazine called Inside News (in which he authored "Who Really Killed Howard Rushmore?"), as well as one-shot publications like New York Confidential. Harrison continued to live in New York City during the next two decades under an assumed name, while plotting a comeback. But lacking the financial pressures that drove Harrison to create his previous magazines, he was essentially retired, living his remaining years at "the Delmonico Hotel, at 59th Street and Park Avenue." Robert Harrison died in 1978 with his long-time mistress, Regi Ruta, at his side; that same year Confidential was shut down.

== Legal activity ==
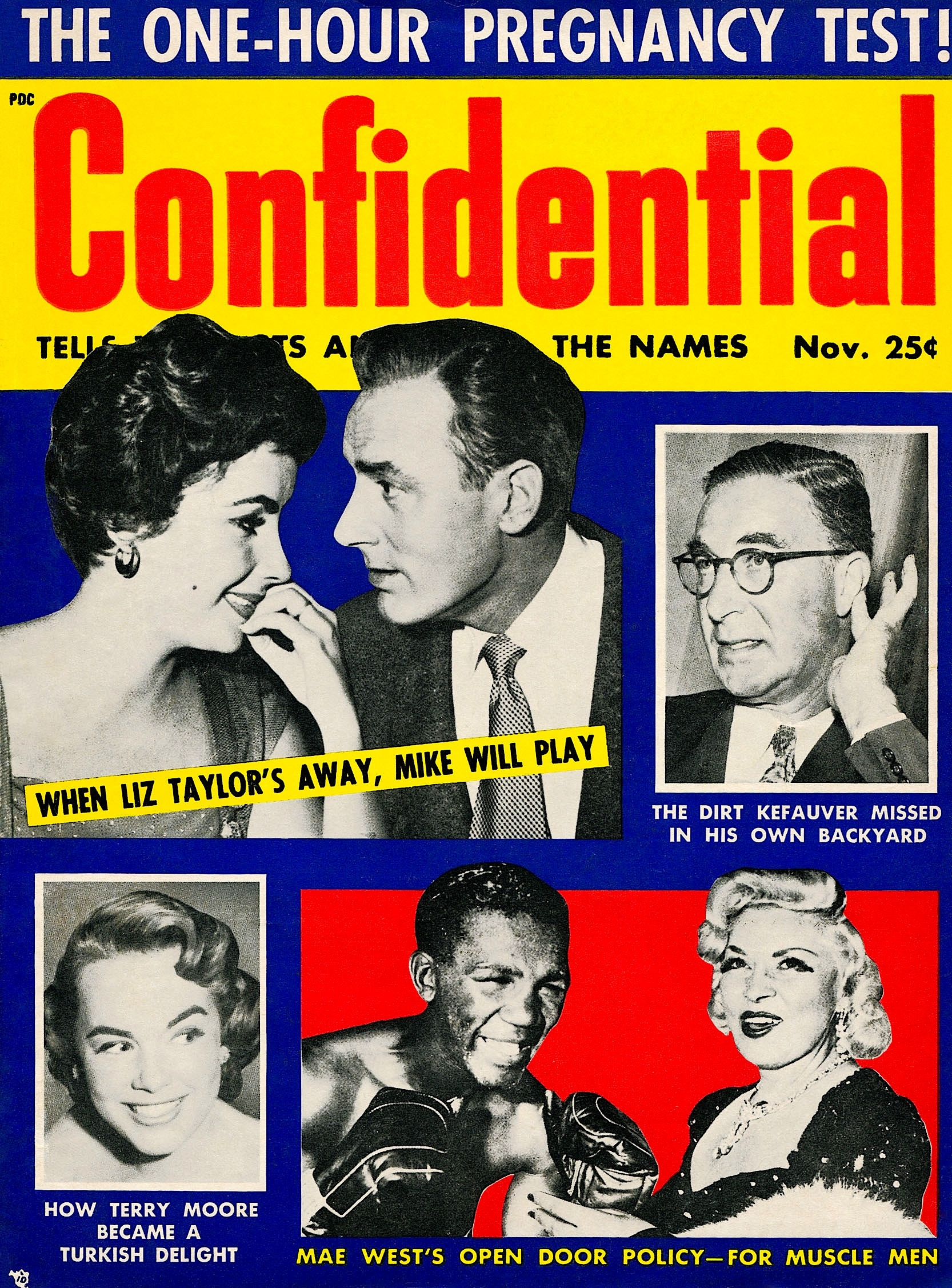
Confidential, November 1955, with cover stories on Mae West and Terry Moore

- Following a highly-unflattering article about Cuban dictator Fulgencio Batista, an attempt was made to ban the magazine from sale in Cuba.
- In the May 1955 issue of Confidential, "Doris Duke and Her African Prince" appeared. The story alleged that Doris Duke had an affair with a "Negro handyman and chauffeur," whom the article said she once employed. In July 1955, Doris Duke sued the magazine for $3 million, claiming libel.
- In August 1955, US Postmaster General Arthur Summerfield barred Confidential from the mails. "Post Office officials objected to among other things, a racy description of a stripteaser's gyrations and a 'questionable' cheesecake photograph of Hollywood Starlet Terry Moore," originally appearing in the Istanbul, French-language newspaper, Millyet.
- Frank Sinatra, subject of a May 1956 Confidential story, "Open Letter To General Mills: Here's Why Frank Sinatra Is The Tarzan Of The Boudoir," threatened to sue Confidential for a story about how Wheaties allegedly enhanced his sex life.
- The July 1957 issue featured a cover story on Liberace headlined "Why Liberace's theme song should be 'Mad About The Boy'." It alleged that the actor had a homosexual dalliance with a press agent in Dallas. Liberace testified before the Los Angeles grand jury but was not called to testify at the actual 1957 trial.
- Tab Hunter, subject of a September 1955 Confidential story, "The Lowdown On That 'Disorderly Conduct' Charge Against Tab Hunter!" was "on 'two-hour call status' for the duration of the trial," but was not called to testify.
- Maureen O'Hara, subject of a March 1957 Confidential story, "It was the hottest show in town when Maureen O'Hara Cuddled in Row 35," testified before the Los Angeles grand jury. She and Dorothy Dandridge were the only subjects of Confidential stories who were called to testify at the 1957 trial.

== Impact ==
Due to Confidential's success, competing magazines soon were created—Exclusive, Exposed, Hush-Hush, Inside, On The Q.T., Rave, Revealed, Side Street, The Lowdown, and Uncensored. All of these magazines had striking slogans in the Confidential "Uncensored And Off The Record" tradition: "All The Facts...All The Names" (Exposed and Uncensored), "What You Don’t Know About The People You Know" (Hush-Hush), "Stories The Newspapers Won’t Print!" (On The Q.T.), "Great Moments of Passion!" (Side Street), "The Facts They Dare Not Tell You" (The Lowdown). Today, the only Confidential-inspired supermarket tabloids in the U.S. that remain are National Enquirer, Globe, InTouch Weekly, OK!, and Life & Style. Television tabloid shows such as A Current Affair and Hard Copy are also inspired by the tabloid, as well as the celebrity news and gossip website TMZ.

== Portrayal in other media ==
Film historians usually assume that Confidential inspired the name of James Ellroy's 1990 novel L.A. Confidential, although the novel's fictional magazine is named Hush-Hush. The novel was adapted into a 1997 film of the same title.

The graphic design of the 1994 album Gratuitous Sax and Senseless Violins by Sparks is an homage to Confidential.

In July 2014, the New York Musical Theatre Festival opened Mr. Confidential, a musical starring Kevin Spirtas as Robert Harrison. The play's title derived from Samuel Bernstein's Robert Harrison biography of the same title.

== See also ==
- Eyeful (1942–1955)
