= Rushmore =

Rushmore may refer to:

== Places ==
=== United Kingdom ===
- Rushmore Hundred, a former hundred (geographic division) in North Dorset, England
- Rushmore Estate, in south Wiltshire, England; see Larmer Tree Gardens
  - Rushmore House, part of the Rushmore Estate in south Wiltshire, England, now part of Sandroyd School

=== United States ===
- Mount Rushmore, South Dakota
  - Rushmore Cave, south-east of Mount Rushmore
- Rushmore, Minnesota, a small city
- Rushmore, Ohio, an unincorporated community

== People ==
- Charles E. Rushmore (1857–1931), American businessman and attorney, namesake of the mountain
- Frederick Margetson Rushmore (1869–1933), British academic, Master of St Catharine's College, Cambridge from 1927 to 1933
- Howard Rushmore (1913–1958), American journalist
- Vivian Rushmore, American stage actress in the 1910s

== Ships ==
- USS Rushmore (LSD-14), a US Navy dock landing ship of World War II
- USS Rushmore (LSD-47), a US Navy dock landing ship

== Entertainment ==
- Rushmore (film), a 1998 motion picture directed by Wes Anderson
  - Rushmore (soundtrack), the soundtrack album to the film
- Rushmore Records, a record label
- Cassandra Rushmore, a fictional character in Australian soap opera Neighbours

== Other uses ==
- Rushmore University, an unaccredited institute of higher learning on the Cayman Islands
- Rushmore Mall, a shopping mall in Rapid City, South Dakota, US
- Rushmore Memorial Library, Highland Mills, New York, US
- Rushmore, a part of the software Foxpro

== See also ==
- Rushmere (disambiguation)
- Rushmoor (disambiguation)
