= Geoff Dakin =

South African cricketer (1935–2026)

Personal information
- Full name: Geoffrey Frank Dakin
- Born: 13 August 1935; Port Elizabeth, Cape Province, South Africa
- Died: 4 May 2026 (aged 90)
- Batting: Right-handed
- Bowling: Right-arm fast-medium

Domestic team information
- Years: Team
- 1952–53 to 1962–63: Eastern Province

Career statistics
Competition	First-class
Matches	59
Runs scored	2741
Batting average	26.10
100s/50s	4/8
Top score	165
Balls bowled	2677
Wickets	27
Bowling average	42.77
5 wickets in innings	0
10 wickets in match	0
Best bowling	4/28
Catches/stumpings	51/–
- Source: Cricket Archive, 13 August 2014

Geoffrey Frank Dakin (13 August 1935 – 4 May 2026) was a South African cricketer and cricket administrator. In 1991, he was elected as the first president of the United Cricket Board, South African cricket's first non-racial governing body.

== Playing career ==
Dakin was educated at Grey High School in Port Elizabeth. He made his first-class debut for Eastern Province in 1952–53, at the age of 17. In six matches that season he scored 279 runs as an opening batsman at an average of 23.25 with a top score of 47, and was Eastern Province's second-highest scorer. He also took 11 catches, more than any other fieldsman in the Currie Cup.

He was a useful pace bowler in the early part of his career, whose best figures were 4 for 28 against the touring New Zealanders in 1953–54, but it was his catching and fielding that stood out. His leadership qualities were also recognised when he was appointed captain of Eastern Province in 1957–58 at the age of 22, a position he held for five seasons.

Dakin was selected in a South African XI to play the touring Australians in 1957–58, but was dismissed cheaply twice by Alan Davidson and took only one wicket, that of Neil Harvey for 173. He scored his first century, 124, in 1958–59, against Orange Free State in a match in which nobody else passed 50. His next century, 143, came against Griqualand West in 1959–60, and was once again easily the highest score in the match.

In 1960–61 Eastern Province won four of their six matches and finished second in the Currie Cup, their best result to that time. Dakin was the team's highest scorer, with 452 runs at 45.20, including 104 against Border, when the 16-year-old Graeme Pollock made his first-class debut for Eastern Province, scoring 54. Dakin's form fell away after 1960–61, apart from one innings in 1962–63 when he made his highest score, 165, against Western Province, putting on 312 for the first wicket with Colin Rushmere. He retired after the 1962–63 season.

== Administrative career ==
After he retired from playing, Dakin became a prominent administrator in Eastern Province and in South Africa generally. In 1991, when the United Cricket Board was established, with the amalgamation of the South African Cricket Union and the South African Cricket Board into a non-racial entity, Geoff Dakin was elected as the first President.

== Personal life and death ==
Dakin died on 4 May 2026, at the age of 90.

His son Grant Dakin and grandson Stephen Fensham have also played first-class cricket in South Africa.
