= Howard Rushmore =

American journalist (1913–1958)

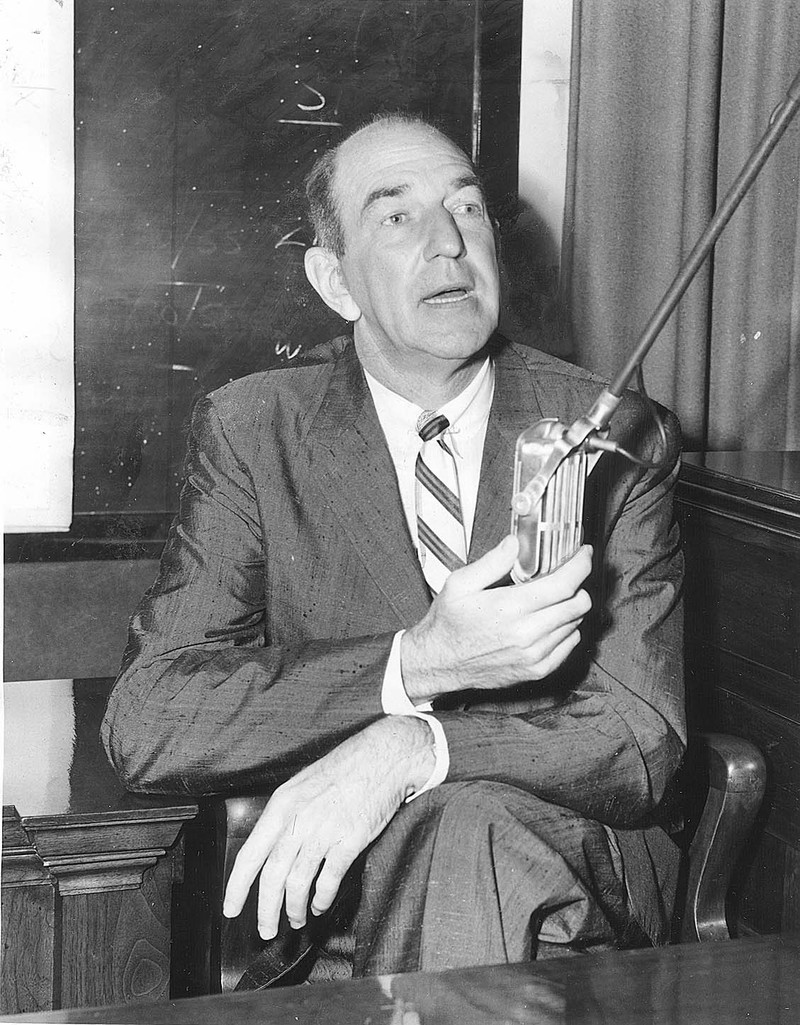
- Rushmore in 1957
- Born: Howard Rushmore; July 2, 1913; Mitchell, South Dakota, U.S.
- Died: January 3, 1958 (aged 44); New York City, U.S.
- Cause of death: Suicide by gunshot
- Other names: Brooks Martin, Kenneth G. McLain, Juan Morales, Matt Williams
- Education: St. Brendan's Catholic School
- Occupations: Journalist, film reviewer
- Years active: 1929–1958
- Political party: Communist (before 1939); Republican (after 1939)
- Spouses: Ruth Garvin (m. 1936; div. 1945) Frances Everitt McCoy (m. 1945)

Howard Clifford Rushmore (July 2, 1913 – January 3, 1958) was an American journalist, nationally known for investigative reporting. As a communist, he reported for The Daily Worker; later, he became anti-communist and wrote for publications including the New York Journal-American and Confidential magazine. Rushmore killed himself and his wife in a murder-suicide in 1958.

== Background ==
Howard Rushmore was born in Mitchell, South Dakota, the only child to Clifford Glen Rushmore (1877–1947) and Rosa Lee Rushmore (née Palmer; 1882–1955). He was a tenth-generation American whose father's New England ancestors fought in the Revolutionary War. His mother's ancestors "came to the dark and bloody ground" of the Great Plains "with Daniel Boone from the East." Ancestors of both parents were among the first American settlers of Missouri Territory. One of Rushmore's grandfathers fought for the Confederate Army.

Rushmore described his own inauspicious beginnings: "When I was eight, my father lost his job in the railroad yards of Sheridan, Wyoming and took advantage of the government homestead offers to 'prove up' a 320-acre claim. We had no irrigation, no modern machinery; a flat-bed wagon was our only means of transportation." He worked from dawn to dusk, seven days a week, while his mother milked the cows and slopped the hogs and tended a large garden. His father, now "a fifteen-hour-a-day farmer pitted two hundred pounds of muscle and bone against the black gumbo (local soil) and finally lost." Rushmore's parents worked hard for very little in return. "They grew old before my eyes," he would write.

Rushmore and his parents returned to his mother's hometown of Mexico, Missouri, sometime during the mid-1920s, where they settled temporarily at her nearby family's house. Rushmore's father found work as a brickyard worker but the family was hit hard economically by the Great Depression, which started Rushmore's lifelong interest in politics. He grew up in poverty in Mexico, and his family moved constantly from house to house. A defeated man, Rushmore's father was apolitical, but his wife was an optimistic Democrat and strong supporter of President Franklin Roosevelt, which influenced her son's early political outlook.

In appearance, Rushmore was usually described as a gangly, 6'5" teenager. Political columnist and friend George Sokolsky would later describe Rushmore as "at heart a hillbilly, proud of his colonial ancestry ... he himself was an enormous disappointment to himself ... a sad mountain boy, morose, looking for something he could never find." As a result of his appearance and manner, he was held in ridicule by his peers in high school.

Rushmore wanted to make his mark as a progressive journalist and at the age of 16 wrote for two newspapers—the Mexico High School Yellow Yap and The Mexico Ledger. During his junior year of high school, he was expelled for publishing several exposés in the Ledger that the school administration regarded as defamatory about themselves and the teaching staff. Rushmore's parents then enrolled him in St. Brendan's Catholic School, despite the family being Methodists. There Rushmore was even further ostracized, resulting in his quitting school altogether.

== Career ==
=== Communist publications ===
Rushmore continued as a reporter for the Mexico Intelligencer. On January 12, 1931, he witnessed the lynching of Raymond Gunn, in which the African-American suspect was seized from the local sheriff, doused with gasoline atop a roof and set aflame while several thousands watched. The event made an indelible mark on the 17-year-old Rushmore, who, even at the height of his anti-communist career, would maintain Gunn's complete innocence.

In the 1940s, when the Communist Party USA (CPUSA) in Kansas City organized an anti-lynching committee led by Harlem-based party organizer Abner Berry, Rushmore was impressed by the bravery and anti-racist stance of the communists. Through the committee, Rushmore met Jack Conroy, editor of The Anvil, a communist literary magazine. Conroy encouraged Rushmore's literary ambitions by suggesting he submit short stories. By April 1935 Rushmore had become an associate editor of the magazine. Later that year, Rushmore joined the Young Communist League USA (YCLUSA) in St. Louis despite having neither a technical knowledge of Marxist philosophy nor its history. This lifelong ignorance would hamper his authority as a professional communist and anti-communist as critics would question his qualifications on the subject.

As a member of the YCLUSA, Rushmore organized farmers in the Dakotas and Iowa. Conroy then sent Rushmore to New York City in May 1935, where he attended the American Writers Congress. There he was asked to join the editorial staff of the Young Worker, the organ of the YCLUSA. Taking advantage of his perceived all-American background, the CPUSA rapidly promoted Rushmore. All staff members of the Young Worker were assigned to a political unit of the YCLUSA; Rushmore belonged to the Harlem unit, where he met Ruby Bates, a recent recruit to the youth league. Bates was one of the two women who had accused the Scottsboro Boys of rape, only to later recant her original testimony during the Patterson trial.

Rushmore graduated to The Daily Worker as "a $25-a-week writer." After a series of girlfriends, he began dating Ruth Garvin, who wrote the women's column for the Sunday Worker Progressive Weekly. They married on October 12, 1936, when Rushmore was aged 23. Rushmore rose to become the paper's official film critic by 1939, but in December he was fired for giving an ambivalent review of Gone with the Wind; despite describing the film as a "magnificent bore" and holding to the standard CPUSA line that the film was "racist," his review was regarded as insufficiently negative by the editorial board because he admired the film's technical aspects. The chief editor of the Worker, Benjamin J. Davis, Jr., who personally fired Rushmore, was particularly incensed at Rushmore's refusal to rewrite the review. However, the sacking backfired as it made the front page of all the major New York newspapers, including the New York Journal-American, New York Post and The New York Times, as well as mainstream papers across the country, which were supportive of Rushmore. The resulting publicity made the 26-year-old an instant celebrity in anti-communist circles. One of the most prominent columnists of the era, Westbrook Pegler, gave Rushmore rousing support in his December 29, 1939, column.

=== Hearst years ===
After his firing from The Daily Worker, Rushmore joined the anti-communist Hearst-owned Journal-American. On December 22, 1939, the day most papers published news of Rushmore's firing, the Worker published an official notice of his termination and gave the reasons. The next day, the Journal-American published "Red Paper's Lies Bared by Ex-Critic", in which Rushmore defended his film review.

In early 1940, Rushmore applied for a job at Time magazine via fellow ex-communist Whittaker Chambers. Not knowing Rushmore and fearful as to how he realized he was a fellow ex-communist, Chambers turned him away.

At the Journal-American, Rushmore reinvented himself from a communist sympathizer to an anti-communist investigator of the very industry that produced the films he once reviewed. In 1943, his wife Ruth gave birth to one daughter named Barbara. In 1940 he began to write anti-communist articles for the American Mercury, continuing up to the mid-1950s with his "Heard on the Party Line" column. As his celebrity increased, Rushmore hired a Broadway press agent to manage his career. Columnist Walter Winchell began mentoring him.

Leaving behind his old communist comrades, Rushmore also separated from Ruth. During 1944–45, he met a new staff writer on the Journal-American, Marjorie Frances McCoy (née Everitt), a widow with two young daughters, Jean and Lynn. A former beauty contest winner from Charlotte, North Carolina, McCoy became a Powers model-cover girl and later an editor at Woman's Day. After the death of her first husband, she returned to New York City, where at the Journal-American she became fashion editor. In 1945, after obtaining a Mexican divorce from his first wife, Rushmore married McCoy in a ceremony in Bridgeport, Connecticut. In response, Ruth attempted to have him arrested for bigamy, with her lawyer maintaining that the Mexican divorce was invalid.

=== HUAC ===
In 1947, Rushmore became a key witness in the House Un-American Activities Committee's hearings in Washington, D.C., the first of two investigations of the film industry to assess communist infiltration of Hollywood through the Hollywood Anti-Nazi League and labor unions, and the extent of communist propaganda that made it into films. The investigations were motivated by the domestic activities of the brothers Gerhart and Hanns Eisler, both communist refugees living in America during World War II.

At the hearings, Rushmore testified against Edward G. Robinson, Charles Chaplin, Clifford Odets and Dalton Trumbo as potential or actual communists: "the Daily Worker regarded Charles Chaplin and Edward G. Robinson as what we call in the newspaper business 'sacred cows,' people you trust favorably. I don't know whether or not [Robinson] is a Communist, but for ten years he has been joining front organizations and is still doing it." However, unknown to the public at large, since 1943 the United States Army Signal Intelligence Service was decrypting Soviet intelligence traffic through the Venona project, which revealed that most Soviet agents operated in the eastern U.S. While Soviet agents like Otto Katz operated propaganda fronts like the Hollywood Anti-Nazi League in the 1930s, Venona failed to reveal any Soviet agent working in Hollywood directly involved with espionage or sabotage, though many film industry figures associated with the CPUSA would be blacklisted by the major studios. The public's unawareness of Venona enabled Rushmore to exaggerate the threat of communists in Hollywood. But at the HUAC hearings, Rushmore did correctly identify Gerhart Eisler as the probable Soviet leader of the CPUSA. The opening of the Soviet archives decades later showed that Eisler, a Comintern agent, used his political authority to make Earl Browder the American "leader" of the CPUSA during a mid-1930s leadership dispute.

As a professional anti-communist, even unknowns were targeted by Rushmore beyond the HUAC hearings. At least two suicides resulted from his exposés, including Minnie Gutride, a 40-year-old elementary school teacher and Russian-American widow, who killed herself by putting her head inside a gas oven in her Manhattan apartment after being fired by William Jansen, the NYC school superintendent. The United Federation of Teachers complained that Jansen was influenced by allegations from the Journal-American, which said that Gutride was a secret communist organizer for the longshoremen unions. Rushmore would later boast about causing Gutride's suicide, much to the consternation of his friends. His fame and notoriety increased by such incidents, Rushmore would eventually be seen dining with William F. Buckley at the Stork Club – and even inside the club's inner sanctum, the Cub Room – with "his wife (Frances), Roy Cohn and his girl-friend."

=== McCarthy ===
On November 27, 1949, Rushmore published in the Journal-American allegations of communist infiltration of U.S. naval vessels. Though the facts of the article were invented by Rushmore, by coincidence the Federal Bureau of Investigation (FBI) was conducting its own investigation on the same matter. Initially, J. Edgar Hoover thought that Rushmore had access to genuine intelligence and ordered his telephone tapped. In July 1948, in Olympia, Washington, Rushmore testified before the Canwell Committee, a state committee to investigate subversive activities at the University of Washington. There he switched the subject to Washington, D.C., waving a piece of paper that he claimed was an FBI report that named 150 federal employees as members of a Soviet spy ring. When FBI agents intercepted him in a hotel lobby and asked about the document, he showed them a four-page letter that he typed himself. Then, in the spring of 1953, Senator Joseph McCarthy asked Hoover about Rushmore's bonafides. The FBI's reply warned against relying on Rushmore's veracity: "[His] writings have proved unreliable, due to his tendency to sensationalize and blow up fragments of information." Though the FBI regarded Rushmore as a publicity seeker, McCarthy hired Rushmore anyway.

During the late 1940s–early 1950s, a group of State Department employees complained about "left-wingers" and "pro-Reds" working at the Voice of America (VOA) facilities at 57th Street, New York City. They managed to get the interest of Senator McCarthy, who assumed chairmanship of the Subcommittee on Investigations in 1953. After clearing the VOA hearings with Republican senate leaders, McCarthy hired Rushmore as director of research that spring.

The 1953 televised hearings would be held in New York City. Chief counsel Roy Cohn set up headquarters at the Waldorf-Astoria Hotel, where witnesses would be questioned and evidence collected. During the hearings, McCarthy himself would repeat the Rushmorean flourish of waving a suspect list. Before the hearings were over, however, Rushmore resigned from the subcommittee for a brief return at the Journal-American. As director of research, he channeled all pre-hearing testimony through his office, which he would use as raw material for sensational newspaper articles. The public would read about the subcommittee's plan of attack before it could be presented at the hearings, thus sabotaging the entire purpose of the proceedings. As chief counsel, Cohn could have fired Rushmore and initiated felony charges against him for leaking evidence, but Cohn instructed the staff not to release information to Rushmore unless it was cleared with him. Despite Cohn's restraint, Rushmore quit in outrage. After criticizing his estranged friend in print, Rushmore was fired from the Journal-American. Then his old mentor, Walter Winchell, got him a new editorial job.

=== Confidential ===
==== Harrison ====
Under Winchell's sponsorship, Rushmore became the chief editor of a New York scandal magazine, Confidential. Its publisher, Robert Harrison, began as an office boy and later writer for Bernarr McFadden's New York Graphic during the 1920s, an ancestor of the supermarket tabloids that would emerge in the 1960s. It was at the Graphic where the young Harrison first met Winchell. As an adult Harrison was on the editorial staff of the Motion Picture Herald, a trade publication whose conservative Catholic owner, Martin Quigley, Sr., had close ties to the Hays Office. Having learned from Quigley what he could get away with legally, Harrison struck out on his own with a series of non-pornographic "cheesecake" magazines.

Supposedly inspired by the Kefauver Committee hearings, Harrison later launched a tabloid-style gossip magazine focused on the substance abuse habits, criminal records and hidden political and sexual preferences of celebrities. Film historian Mary Desjardins described Confidential's editorial style as using "research methods and writing techniques that recycled old stories or created 'composite' facts as the basis of new ones." Harrison himself described it thus: "Once we establish the star in the hay and that's documented, we can say anything we want and I think we make them a hell of a lot more interesting than they really are. What's a guy gonna do, sue us and admit he was in the hay with the dame, but claim he didn't do all the other things we dress the story with?" Before Rushmore's tenure at Confidential, Harrison published stories like "Is It True What They Say About Johnnie Ray?" and "Why Joe DiMaggio Is Striking Out with Marilyn Monroe!" With "Winchell Was Right About Josephine Baker!", Harrison came out in support of his childhood mentor at the Graphic during the Stork Club controversy. Though Harrison would publish non-show business stories involving "racketeering, consumer scams and politicians' peccadilloes," "exposés of star secrets" became Confidential's prime focus.

From his headquarters in New York City, Harrison developed a Hollywood network of informants—prostitutes, hotel employees, down-on-their-luck actors and vengeful celebrities—working with local detective agencies like the Fred Otash Detective Bureau and H. L. Von Wittenburg's Hollywood Detective Agency. Among the informants were minor actresses like Francesca De Scaffa (ex-wife of Bruce Cabot) and Ronnie Quillan (ex-wife of screenwriter Joseph Quillan). According to Harrison, Barbara Payton would stop by Confidential's Hollywood office and sell a story whenever she was short of cash. However, the informants could rise to the level of prominent Hollywood columnists like Florabel Muir and in some cases, all the way up to a producer like Mike Todd or even a studio head like Harry Cohn. Money, publicity, revenge or blackmail was the lure.

==== Editorship ====
Rushmore, having earned the enmity of McCarthyite papers like those of the Hearst chain, found himself cut off from his usual employment. He hoped to use Confidential as a new venue to expose communists, though he often had to settle for suspected Hollywood "fellow travellers", who, he implied in his stories, were sexual "deviates." While his anti-communist hit pieces appeared under his own name, Rushmore used a host of pseudonyms for Hollywood exposés such as "Juan Morales" for "The Lavender Skeletons in TV's Closet" and "Hollywood—Where Men Are Men, and Women, Too!", or "Brooks Martin" for the Zsa Zsa Gabor story "Don't Be Fooled by the Glamour Pusses." Beside Rushmore-authored pieces unmasking communists and homosexuals in Washington and Hollywood, he also wrote how-to articles on divorce and conducting extramarital affairs, echoing his past relationships with his two wives. Rushmore did spare his mentor from Missouri, Jack Conroy, from the pages of Confidential.

In January 1955, Rushmore flew to Los Angeles to confer with old Harrison informants like De Scaffa and Quillan. He also recruited new ones like Mike Connolly of The Hollywood Reporter and Agnes Underwood of the Los Angeles Herald Express. One of Rushmore's most prolific discoveries was United Press columnist Aline Mosby. Despite his high salary, Rushmore was repelled by the informants and Harrison. Rushmore considered his employer a "pornographer," even though he himself was a collector of erotica.

Contrary to the popular legend that Confidential double-checked its facts before publishing its articles, as well as being vetted by the magazine's lawyers as "suit-proof", proposed stories were either immediately printed without vetting or, more typically, Marjorie Meade – Harrison's 26-year-old niece and the head of Confidential's intelligence-gathering front, Hollywood Research Inc. – would either personally visit a subject or dispatch an agent to present a copy of a future issue as a "buy-back" proposal, agreeing to hold the story back for in exchange for information on other celebrities. In this capacity, Meade played a key role in the Harrison enterprise's evolution into a "quasi-blackmail operation." However, in 1955 actors Lizabeth Scott and Robert Mitchum decided to sue the magazine rather than give in their demands. Their attorney was Jerry Geisler.

On July 8, 1955, during an appearance on The Tom Duggan Show in Chicago, Rushmore claimed on air that he was on a secret mission to uncover the communist assassins of former Secretary of Defense James Forrestal, and appealed to viewers to help him locate the leader of the "Chicago Communist Party," whose name was given as "Lazarovich." Rushmore later disappeared from his hotel room, leading to a nationwide manhunt by the FBI. As the nation speculated that Rushmore was either kidnapped or murdered by communists, he was discovered hiding under the name "H. Roberts" at the Hotel Finlen in Butte, Montana. Meanwhile, news reporters found "Lazarovich" living in Manhattan under his real name of William Lazar. Lazar said, "It's a simple fact that I live quite normally in Manhattan and that any green cub reporter would not have the slightest difficulty in locating me if he honestly wanted to." Associate Director of the FBI, Clyde Tolson, wrote in the margin of a report on the disappearance: "Rushmore must be a 'nut.' We should have nothing to do with him." J. Edgar Hoover added: "I certainly agree."

=== 1957 mistrial ===
Meanwhile, Rushmore's second marriage was deteriorating. In addition to his amphetamine abuse, Rushmore had become an alcoholic, as had his wife Frances. On Monday, September 5, 1955, Frances jumped into the East River in a suicide attempt but was rescued by an air terminal worker. After admitting to the police that she jumped into the water on her own volition, she was taken to Bellevue for observation. Having quit the Journal-American after eleven years, Frances became an account executive for Klingman & Spencer, a prominent Manhattan public relations firm. Meanwhile, Rushmore tried to get Harrison to publish a story about former First Lady Eleanor Roosevelt having an alleged affair with her African-American chauffeur. When Harrison refused, Rushmore quit. By early February 1956, he was reportedly an editor at the National Police Gazette.

The next spring, despite Giesler's reassurances to the press, Scott's legal effort against Confidential would go nowhere; since the magazine was domiciled in New York State, and the plaintiffs were California residents who initiated the suits in their own state, the suits were quashed. Despite this setback, in addition to Scott's suit, "Giesler said he also would refile in New York a $2 million suit by actor Robert Mitchum against the magazine if it also is quashed here." Though Giesler's initial attack failed, lawsuits from other actors continued to pile up. Back in New York, Rushmore used his severance pay from Confidential to buy a plane ticket to California, where he contacted Giesler's office and offered to become a witness in exchange for a job in Hollywood; Giesler refused. Rushmore then became a witness for California Attorney General Edmund "Pat" Brown. Since Confidential was ensconced in New York State, and New York refused to let Brown extradite Harrison to California, Brown instead put Meade and Hollywood Research Inc. on trial.

On August 7, 1957, The People of the State of California v. Robert Harrison et al. trial began. It would eventually involve over 200 actors, most of whom fled California to avoid defense subpoenas. Rushmore, now the state's star witness, testified that Confidential knowingly published unverified allegations despite the magazine's reputation for double-checking facts: "Some of the stories are true and some have nothing to back them up at all. Harrison many times overruled his libel attorneys and went ahead on something." According to Rushmore, Harrison told the attorneys, "I'd go out of business if I printed the kind of stuff you guys want." Rushmore even fingered Aline Mosby, who was in the press galleries covering the trial for United Press, revealing that she had written upward to twenty-four stories for Confidential; United Press was forced to replace Mosby with another reporter.

Despite the testimony, the case ended in a mistrial on October 1, 1957, when the jury could not agree on a verdict after two weeks of deliberations. Brown preempted Confidential's win by calling for a retrial, rattling Harrison. To spare his niece another ordeal, Harrison promised Brown to publish only positive stories in his magazine from that point forward.

== Death ==
Though Rushmore thought himself a hero for exposing Confidential, he became a pariah in the publishing world. He was no longer an editor at the Police Gazette, though he would stop by to scrounge up work. By 1957, he was reduced to writing occasional articles on hunting for outdoors magazines. Rushmore's last known assignments were for True War magazine.

In December 1957, Rushmore chased his wife and teenaged step-daughter Lynn out of their Manhattan home with a shotgun. Two days before Christmas, Frances and her daughter left their home on the advice of her psychiatrist and stayed with Frances' eldest daughter, 20-year-old Jean Dobbins of Greenwich Village. Frances and Lynn later took over a friend's apartment. While Frances was under psychiatric care since the East River incident, Rushmore himself was now under psychiatric care.

On January 3, 1958, at 6:15 pm, a few days before Frances was scheduled to lead a group of editors on a trip to Brazil, the Rushmores met inside the lobby of their apartment building in a final attempt at reconciliation. Frances was due to have dinner at the Dobbins' at 8 pm. When an argument broke out between the couple, Frances left to hail a taxi. Taxi driver Edward Pearlman picked her up at Madison Avenue and 97th Street. Simultaneously, Rushmore entered the cab. As the two continued arguing, Pearlman ordered him out of the cab to which he replied, "I'm her husband, don't worry about it." "Where do you want to go?" Pearlman asked. "Take me to a police station," Frances said. As the cab raced to the 23rd Precinct at Third and 104th, Rushmore shot Frances in the right side of the head and neck, then put the pistol to his temple and shot himself. Both died. At the police station, an unregistered .32 caliber Colt revolver was found in Rushmore's hand and a seven-inch commando knife inside the waistband of his trousers.

Jean Dobbins speculated that her mother's refusal to take Rushmore to Brazil might have started the argument that ended in the shooting. Contrary to general expectations, Dobbins said her parents quarreled "over personal things, not Rushmore's controversial public life ... 'He was very possessive, very jealous, and wanted to go everywhere with her." Frances' father, Louis Everitt, the owner of a women's shoe store in Charlotte, brought his daughter's body back to North Carolina.

A police search of the Rushmore apartment at 16 East 93rd Street revealed "a valuable gun collection ... along with an extensive collection of pornographic pictures." Dobbins was initially hesitant to claim her stepfather's body, though willing to do so if no blood-relation was willing; she did not want him to be buried in New York City's "potter's field." After Rushmore's body lay unclaimed at Bellevue for five days, his first wife Ruth, now a secretary, took custody. She held a private service at an undisclosed location, had the body cremated and sent the ashes back to be buried in Mexico, Missouri, "back to the 'dark and bloody ground.'"
