= Eyeful (1942–1955) =

Men's cheesecake magazine

Eyeful was a men's cheesecake magazine published by Robert Harrison and known for regularly featuring Bettie Page. The magazine had a bi-monthly, 65-issue run, with the first issue published in March 1943 and the last issue published in April 1955. Like most other magazines in Harrison's empire, it features covers by one of the most prolific pinup cover artists of the 1940s and 50's, Peter Driben.

== History ==
The magazine was intended to glorify the American girl, and was promoted with the tag line "Gals, Gags, Giggles". The tag line later was changed to “Glorifying the American Girl,” as the magazine started featuring more showgirls and burlesque dancers.

Its popularity sharply dropped off after the initial publication of Playboy in 1953. Playboy featured very similar content and format to Eyeful, but also introduced the celebrity nude center-fold concept, with Marilyn Monroe in the centre of its first publication, which Harrison refused to copy and compete with.

== Editorial policy ==
Eyeful featured most (if not all) of the most popular burlesque dancer, pinup and stripper models working in New York at the time.

Just like the other magazines in Robert Harrison's magazine empire, it drew the line at using outright nudity. While other magazines in the Harrison's moved towards showing models in progressively more risqué and compromising positions over the years, Eyeful was known for remaining more tame, and primarily featured more the classical pin-up looks of fully or partially clothed women in intimate and playful positions.

The blended adult humour pictorials amongst the pinup photos, and followed formulaic templates for most of its content. Examples include photo heavy, humorous articles "on the science of sleeping", as well as "find the difference" type games.
