= Rushmoor (disambiguation) =

Rushmoor is a district in the English county of Hampshire.

Rushmoor may also refer to:

- Rushmoor, Shropshire, a United Kingdom location
- Rushmoor, Surrey, England, a village

== See also ==
- Rushmore (disambiguation)
