= Hotel Finlen =

Historic hotel in Butte, Montana

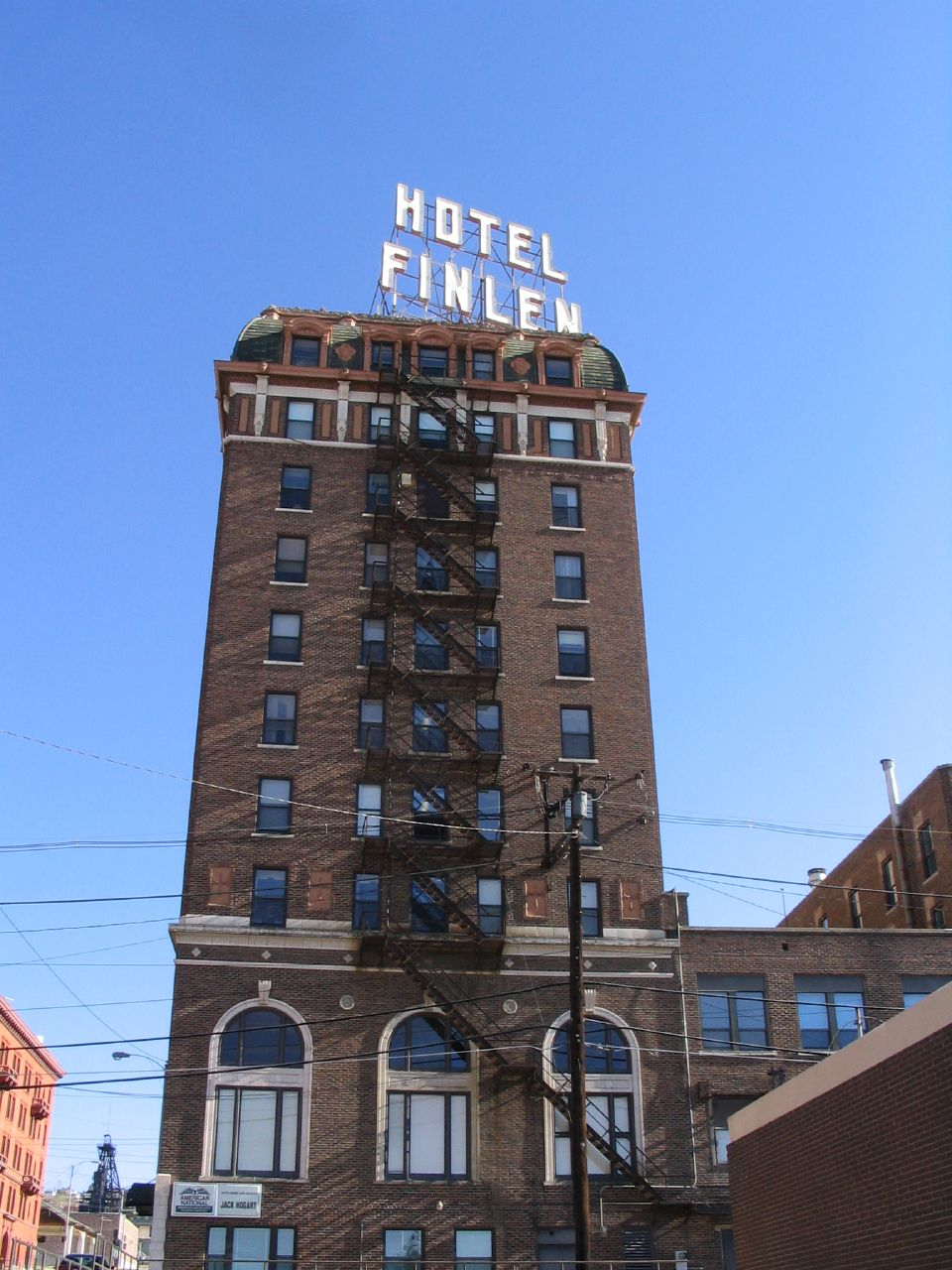
- Interactive map of the Hotel Finlen area

General information
- Location: Butte, Montana, U.S.
- Coordinates: 46.012840°N 112.535580°W
- Opening: January 1, 1924

Technical details
- Floor count: 9

Other information
- Number of rooms: 250

Hotel Finlen is a historic hotel in Butte, Montana, United States, built in 1924.

== History ==
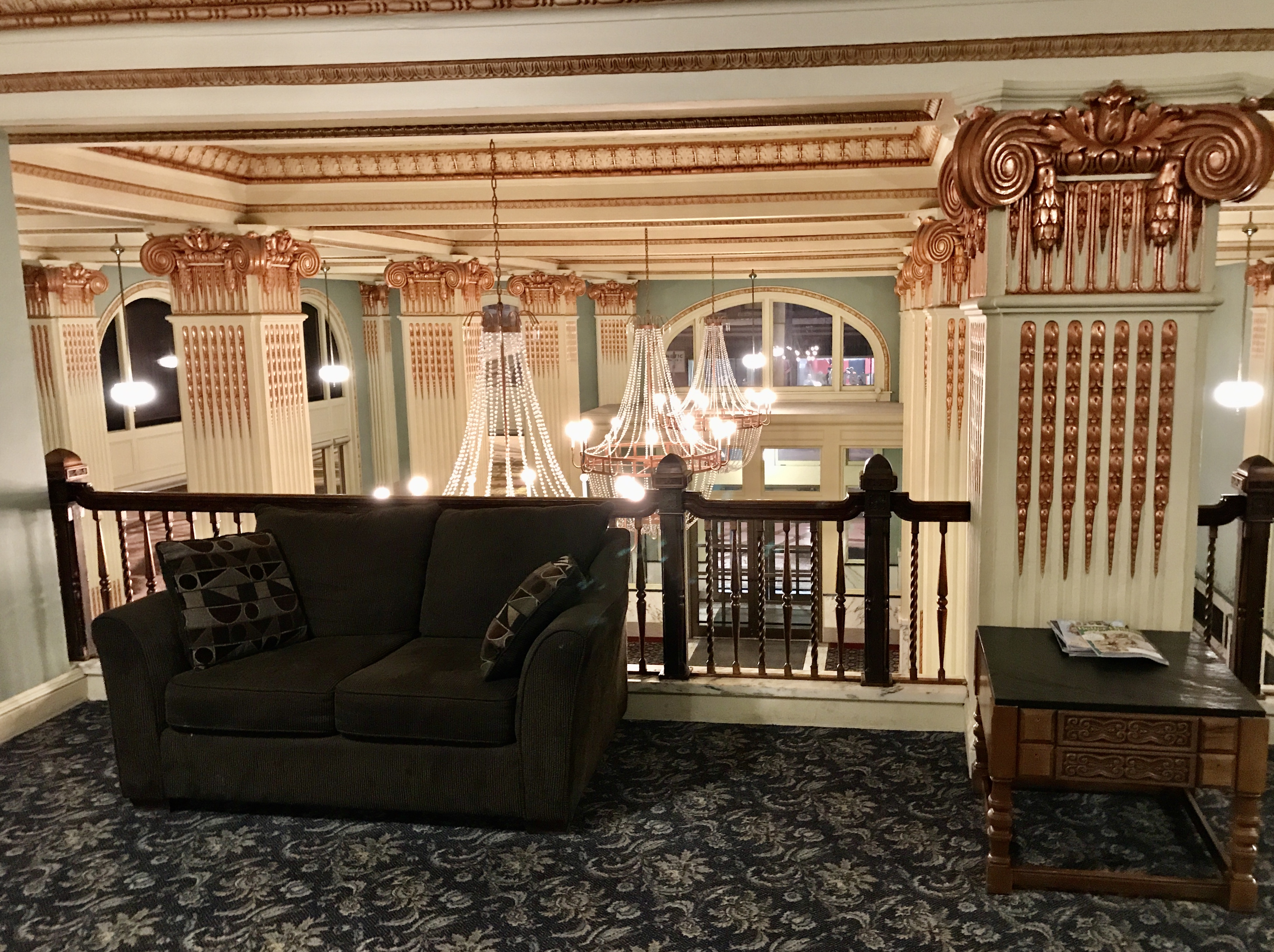
Hotel mezzanine, photographed in 2020

The Hotel Finlen was established by James Finlen, the son of Miles Finlen, an Irish immigrant who had opened the McDermitt Hotel in Butte in 1889. The Hotel Finlen opened on January 1, 1924, and was architecturally inspired by the Astor Hotel in New York City. It was completed on a budget of $750,000 (equivalent to $14,089,806 in 2025). The tallest tower on the building was finished in 1924, and construction on a second tower began in 1927, but went unfinished due to the stock market crash of 1929.

In 2018, the hotel was acquired by a group of four investors led by J. J. Adams, a professor at Montana Tech, by the Taras family, who had owned the hotel for approximately 40 years.

== Notable guests ==
The hotel was visited by various notable guests throughout the 20th century, including aviator Charles Lindbergh and Presidents Harry S. Truman and John F. Kennedy.
