= Aline Mosby =

American journalist (1922–1998)

- Born: Aline Mosby; July 27, 1922; Missoula, Montana, U.S.
- Died: August 7, 1998 (aged 76); Escondido, California, U.S.
- Education: University of Montana
- Occupation: Journalist
- Years active: 1962–1984

Aline Mosby (July 7, 1922 – August 7, 1998) was an American journalist.

Mosby mostly wrote for United Press International. She was the first American woman correspondent assigned by a major news service to the Moscow Kremlin and later Beijing. While in the Soviet Union, she met and interviewed Lee Harvey Oswald in 1959, four years before he assassinated U.S. President John F. Kennedy. Mosby was also the first journalist to report on the Marilyn Monroe nude calendar.

== Early life ==
Mosby was born in Missoula, Montana. She earned a journalism degree at the University of Montana.

== Career ==
Mosby worked as editor for a college issue of Madamoiselle before she joined United Press in Seattle in 1943. She moved to the Los Angeles bureau office in the 1950s, working as a radio news writer and feature writer during United Nations meetings in San Francisco. She was also a special Hollywood correspondent for six years. She famously covered a nudist convention in San Bernardino County. She was also one of the first to interview Marilyn Monroe after nude photos she had posed for in 1949 were published as a calendar. Mosby is regarded by news historians as helping Monroe become a more-notable star. She wrote anonymously for gossip magazine Confidential.

She temporarily resigned from the UP in Los Angeles and moved to Europe, signing with the London UP office shortly afterwards. From there, she was assigned to work Paris and then became the first American woman correspondent assigned to Moscow. In 1959, she interviewed Lee Harvey Oswald, who had exiled himself there. He spoke to her about his upbringing and support of Marxist socialism. She also interviewed downed U-2 pilot Francis Gary Powers. In 1962, she wrote a book titled The View from No. 13 People's Street detailing her experiences in Moscow. FBI documents identify her as a suspected Soviet agent. She was based in Washington, D.C. in 1967. She opened the UPI bureau in Beijing in 1972.

Mosby appeared as herself on May 7, 1962 episode of the CBS game show To Tell the Truth.

== Retirement ==
Mosby retired from United Press International in 1984 and continued to freelance for various publications, including The New York Times.

== Death ==
Mosby died August 7, 1998, of a cerebral hemorrhage at Palomar Medical Center in Escondido, California. She was survived by her sister, Mary Jane Bader.
