= Mark Rushmere =

South African cricketer (born 1965)

Personal information
- Full name: Mark Weir Rushmere
- Born: 7 January 1965 (age 61); Port Elizabeth, South Africa
- Batting: Right-handed
- Bowling: Right-arm medium
- Role: Batsman
- Relatives: Colin Rushmere (father); John Rushmere (uncle)

International information
- National side: South Africa
- Test debut (cap 244): 18 April 1992 v West Indies
- Last Test: 18 April 1992 v West Indies
- ODI debut (cap 20): 2 March 1992 v Sri Lanka
- Last ODI: 12 April 1992 v West Indies

Domestic team information
- Years: Team
- 1983/84–1992/93: Eastern Province
- 1993/94–1995/96: Transvaal

Career statistics
Competition	Test	ODI	FC	LA
Matches	1	4	144	189
Runs scored	6	78	8,494	5,455
Batting average	3.00	19.50	39.32	37.62
100s/50s	0/0	0/0	20/41	6/35
Top score	3	35	188	139
Balls bowled	–	–	122	–
Wickets	–	–	2	–
Bowling average	–	–	26.50	–
5 wickets in innings	–	–	0	–
10 wickets in match	–	–	0	–
Best bowling	–	–	1/0	–
Catches/stumpings	0/–	1/–	73/–	58/–
- Source: Cricinfo, 22 January 2015

Mark Weir Rushmere (born 7 January 1965) is a former South African cricketer who played one Test match and four One Day Internationals (ODIs) for South Africa in 1992.

Rushmere was a right-handed batsman who played for Eastern Province and Transvaal in South African domestic cricket. He played in South Africa's first World Cup in 1992 and also played in South Africa's first post-isolation Test, against the West Indies at Bridgetown, Barbados later in the same year.

Rushmere's father Colin was an all-rounder for Eastern Province and Western Province in the 1950s and 1960s.
