= Colin Rushmere =

South African cricketer

Personal information
- Full name: Colin George Rushmere
- Born: 16 April 1937; Port Elizabeth, Cape Province, South Africa
- Died: 20 January 2017 (aged 79); Port Elizabeth, Eastern Cape, South Africa
- Batting: Right-handed
- Bowling: Right-arm medium
- Relatives: Mark Rushmere (son)

Domestic team information
- Years: Team
- 1956/57–1958/59: Eastern Province
- 1960/61: Western Province
- 1962/63–1965/66: Eastern Province

Career statistics
Competition	First-class
Matches	33
Runs scored	1,245
Batting average	23.05
100s/50s	2/4
Top score	153
Balls bowled	1,686
Wickets	20
Bowling average	28.80
5 wickets in innings	0
10 wickets in match	0
Best bowling	4/29
Catches/stumpings	19/–
- Source: Cricket Archive, 10 August 2014

Colin George Rushmere (16 April 1937 – 20 January 2017) was a South African conservationist and cricketer who played first-class cricket from 1957 to 1965.

== Cricket career ==
Rushmere made his first-class debut for Eastern Province against Orange Free State in a friendly match in 1956–57, scoring 46 and 55 batting at number five, and taking 3 for 49 and 3 for 27 with his medium-pace bowling. In a friendly match the next season against Griqualand West he scored 147 in an innings victory for Eastern Province. He also played several matches for South African Universities between 1955 and 1959, taking 6 for 32 in a two-day match against Orange Free State in 1956–57.

He toured England in 1961 with the South African Fezela XI of promising young players, taking 4 for 29 and 3 for 16 in the victory over Essex. After the tour, however, he played purely as a batsman, usually opening the innings. Against Western Province in 1962–63 he scored 153, putting on 312 for the first wicket with Geoff Dakin. He captained Eastern Province in two matches in the Currie Cup in 1963–64. After scoring only 48 runs in the first three matches in 1965–66 he retired from first-class cricket.

== Later career ==
Rushmere worked with the family law firm Rushmere Noach that his father Colin had founded in 1933 in Port Elizabeth. He also held administrative positions in the Eastern Province Cricket Union, serving as president in the 1980s.

In 1989 he bought 660 hectares of land on the Kariega River and began developing it into a game reserve and resort. In subsequent years Kariega Game Reserve expanded to 10,000 hectares, including land on the Bushman's River. The reserve now has several important conservation species, including lion, elephant, giraffe, black and white rhinoceros, hippopotamus and cape leopard.

Rushmere's brother John played first-class cricket in South Africa in the 1960s. Colin's son Mark played Test cricket for South Africa in the 1990s and now helps to run Kariega Game Reserve.
