= John Rushmere =

South African cricketer

Personal information
- Full name: John Weir Rushmere
- Born: 1 April 1939; Port Elizabeth, Cape Province, South Africa
- Died: 20 August 2025 (aged 86)
- Height: 6 ft 6 in (1.98 m)
- Batting: Right-handed
- Bowling: Left-arm fast
- Relatives: Colin Rushmere (brother); Mark Rushmere (nephew)

Domestic team information
- Years: Team
- 1960/61–1962/63: Western Province

Career statistics
Competition	First-class
Matches	10
Runs scored	231
Batting average	17.76
100s/50s	0/0
Top score	49
Balls bowled	1456
Wickets	25
Bowling average	28.48
5 wickets in innings	1
10 wickets in match	0
Best bowling	6/32
Catches/stumpings	5/–
- Source: Cricinfo, 10 April 2022

John Weir Rushmere (1 April 1939 – 20 August 2025) was a South African architect and rugby player and cricketer.

== Life and career ==
Rushmere was born in Port Elizabeth but attended the University of Cape Town, where he studied architecture. While he was a student there he played for the university rugby team and played first-class cricket for the South African Universities cricket team, as well as playing for the Western Province cricket team in the Currie Cup.

A left-arm fast bowler and useful lower-order batsman, Rushmere had his best first-class bowling figures in his first match when he took 6 for 32 in December 1960 to dismiss Western Province for 89 in the first innings and set up the South African Universities' innings victory. He top-scored for Western Province in their Currie Cup match against Eastern Province in January 1963 when he made 49 batting at number five; his older brother Colin was in the Eastern Province side.

After graduating with a Bachelor of Architecture degree, Rushmere moved to Johannesburg and worked for three years with the architecture firm Associated Architects. He played rugby for the Transvaal provincial team, but quit in 1966 in protest against the excessive influence of the Afrikaner Broederbond over Transvaal rugby. He moved to Port Elizabeth in 1967 and played a few seasons of rugby for Eastern Province before retiring in 1970.

Rushmere was one of the founders of the Port Elizabeth architecture firm Erasmus Rushmere Reid in 1967. His works include the Duckpond pavilion at St George's Park Cricket Ground in Port Elizabeth, and Cullen Bowles House at Rhodes University in Grahamstown. He served as head of Nelson Mandela University's School of Architecture, and was awarded the South African Institute of Architects gold medal in 2001.
