= Peter Driben =

American artist

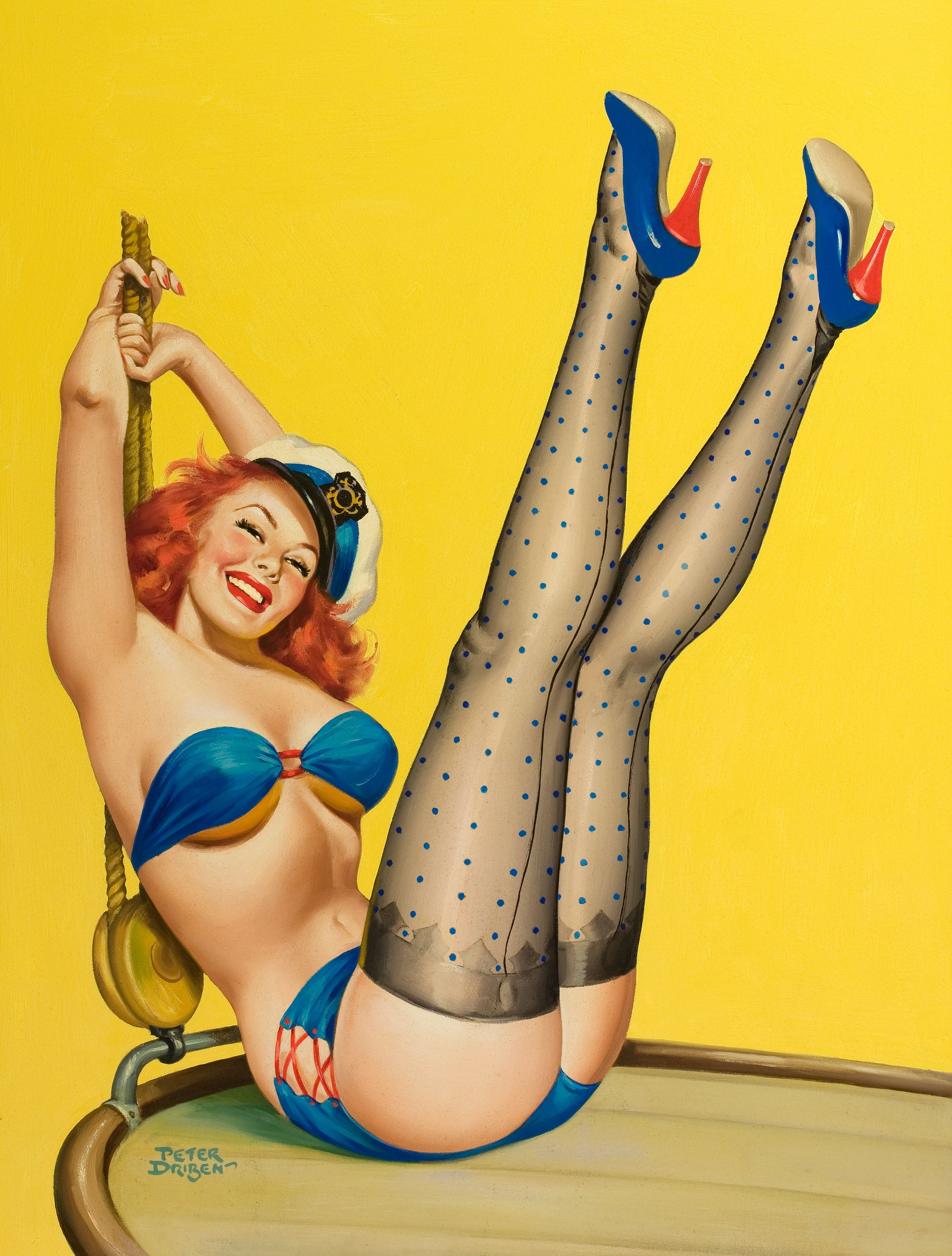
Flirt, pulp cover, April 1953

Peter Driben (October 22, 1903 - September, 1968), an American pin-up artist, was perhaps one of the most productive pin-up artists of the 1940s and 1950s. Although both Alberto Vargas and Gil Elvgren have extensive catalogues of work, neither came close to the output of Driben. Driben's pinups delighted the American public from the beginning of World War II until the great baby boom of the 1950s.

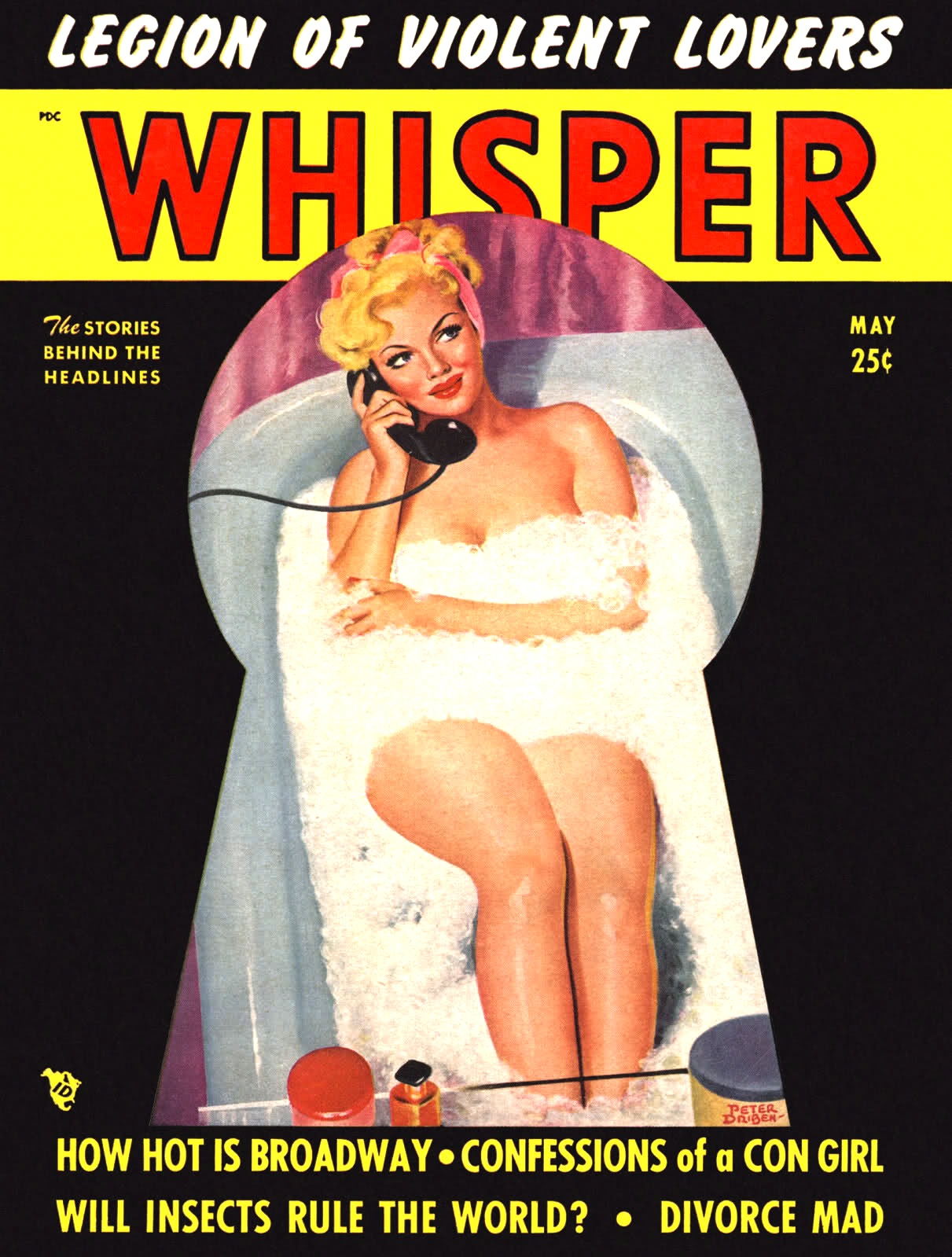
Cover of Whisper magazine, May 1950

Born in Boston, Driben studied at Vesper George Art School before moving to Paris (circa 1925). While taking classes at the Sorbonne in 1925, he began a series of highly popular pen-and-ink drawings of the city's showgirls. His first known pin-up was the cover to La Paree Stories in March 1934. By 1935, he was producing covers for Snappy, Pep, New York Nights, French Night Life and Caprice. Driben's popularity continued to rise in the late thirties with covers for Silk Stocking Stories, Gay Book, Movie Merry-Go-Round and Real Screen Fun.

Driben's career expanded into advertising with his move to New York in late 1936. He created original three-dimensional die-cut window displays for Philco Radios, Cannon Bath Towels, and the Weber Baking Company. Perhaps his most famous work being the original posters and publicity artwork for The Maltese Falcon. Peter Driben was also a close friend of publisher Robert Harrison, and in 1941 was contracted to produce covers for Harrison's new magazine Beauty Parade. Driben went on to paint hundreds of covers for that publication and for the other seven titles Harrison was to launch - Flirt, Whisper, Titter, Wink, Eyeful, Giggles, and Joker. Driben would often have as many as six or seven of his covers being published every month. Driben's work for Harrison established him as one of America's most recognized and successful pin-up and glamour artists. Just before he began to work for Harrison, Driben married the artist, actress and poet, Louise Kirby.

In 1944 he was offered the unusual opportunity, for a pin-up artist, of becoming the art director of the New York Sun, a post he retained until 1946. During the war, his popular painting of American soldiers raising the flag at Iwo Jima sparked a considerable amount of media attention.

In 1956, Driben and Louise moved to Miami Beach, where he spent his retirement years painting portraits (including one of Dwight D. Eisenhower) and other fine-art works, which were organized into successful exhibitions by his wife. Driben died in 1968, Louise in 1984.

== See also ==
- The Great American Pin-Up, Martignette/Meisel (c)2002 Taschen GmbH (ISBN 3-8228-1701-5)
- Peter Driben Bio, The Pin-up Files
- American Art Archives
- Peter Driben Pinup Art Sample
