= Florabel Muir =

American journalist (1889–1970)

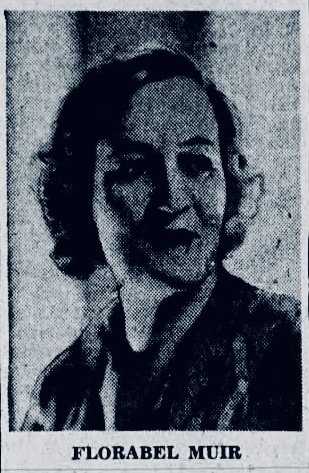
- Born: May 6, 1889; Rock Springs, Territory of Wyoming, U.S.
- Died: April 27, 1970 (aged 80); Los Angeles, California, U.S.
- Resting place: Holy Cross Cemetery
- Education: University of Washington
- Occupations: Reporter; newspaper columnist; author
- Spouse: Denis A. "Denny" Morrison (m. 19?? - 1966; his death)

Florabel Muir (May 6, 1889 – April 27, 1970) was an American reporter, newspaper columnist and author. She became known for covering both Hollywood celebrities and underworld gangsters from the 1920s through the 1960s.

== Career ==
Muir was born in the mining town of Rock Springs, Wyoming. She attended the University of Washington in Seattle, where she worked as the assistant editor of a student paper. She also studied at the University of Nebraska and University of Wyoming.

After graduation, she briefly worked as a teacher before quitting to pursue a career as a newspaper reporter. She began her professional newspaper career at The Salt Lake Herald after convincing the city editor to break with tradition and hire their first female reporter. Eventually, she moved to The Salt Lake Tribune where she was, again, their first female reporter. She worked the night shift covering the police beat. After brief stints at other papers, she went to work for the New York Daily News as a police reporter in 1927.

In 1934, she attempted to quit her newspaper career and become a fiction writer. However, she received and accepted an offer from the New York Post. As a crime reporter, During her years on the crime beat, "she covered the Ruth Snyder murder case and delivered a first-hand account of the murder of gangster Jack (Legs) Diamond" who was gunned down across the street from where she was walking.

Later, she and her husband left for Hollywood after receiving an offer to write screenplays at Fox. She is credited with one screenplay, Fighting Youth (1935), produced by Universal Studios.

She went back to the Daily News as their Los Angeles correspondent when her former editor was having trouble covering a story in Hollywood. While still writing for the Daily News, she also contributed stories to the Saturday Evening Post, The Los Angeles Mirror, and began writing a column, Just for Variety, for Daily Variety. She also hosted programs on radio and television (KFI).

Muir knew several mobsters, including Bugsy Siegel, who she claimed had threatened her over "what she had written about him" during his trial for the murder of Harry Greenberg in 1941, saying "You think because I'm locked up here a punk like you can write anything you please ... Maybe you won't be using that typewriter anymore. Maybe your fingers won't be on your hands. I have people outside who'll break your legs or drop you in a hole if I say the word." After Siegel's murder on 20 June 1947, Muir (who had spoken to Siegel earlier that day; he had called "to thank her for a favourable review" of a show at his Flamingo Hotel) was "one of the first reporters at the scene"; noticing his left eyeball, which "had been blasted out of his head", lying on the floor, she allegedly "picked up the sliver of flesh from which his long eyelashes extended."

Muir was also injured during an attempted assassination of mobster Mickey Cohen at Sherry's restaurant on the Sunset Strip at 3:55 a.m. on July 20, 1949. Cohen was struck in the shoulder. Three others were also wounded, including Cohen henchman Neddie Herbert, who later died from his wounds. Muir was struck in the backside when a slug ricocheted and left a large bruise. Her first instinct was to call the Mirror and get a photographer to the scene while her husband screamed for her to get down. She was also a confidant of Cohen and enlisted her husband to improve Cohen's reading and vocabulary skills.

In 1950, she released her memoirs, Headline Happy.

== Personal life ==
Muir was married to The Saturday Evening Post writer Denis A. "Denny" Morrison. The couple had no children and remained married until Morrison's death on September 24, 1966.

== Death ==
Muir died in Los Angeles on April 27, 1970, at the age of 80. She was interred next to her husband at the Holy Cross Cemetery in Culver City.

== Works ==
- Muir, Florabel (1950). Headline Happy. New York: Henry Holt and Company.
