= Madwoman =

Madwoman may refer to:

- a woman who is insane
- Madwoman (book), a poetry collection by Shara McCallum
- Madwoman: A Contemporary Opera, by Mem Nahadr
- "Madwoman" (song), a 2026 song by Laufey from A Matter of Time: The Final Hour
- "Mad Woman", a 2020 song by Taylor Swift from Folklore

== See also ==
- Madman (disambiguation)
