= Japanese ship Keyaki =

Several ships have been named Keyaki (欅 / けやき, "zelkova serrata") :

- Japanese destroyer Keyaki (1918), a Enoki-class destroyer of the Imperial Japanese Navy
- Japanese destroyer Keyaki (1944), a Matsu-class destroyer of the Imperial Japanese Navy during World War II
- JDS Keyaki (PF-15, PF-295), a Kusu-class patrol frigate of the Japan Maritime Self-Defense Force, formerly USS Evansville (PF-70)
