= USS Gloucester (PF-22) =

Tacoma-class patrol frigate

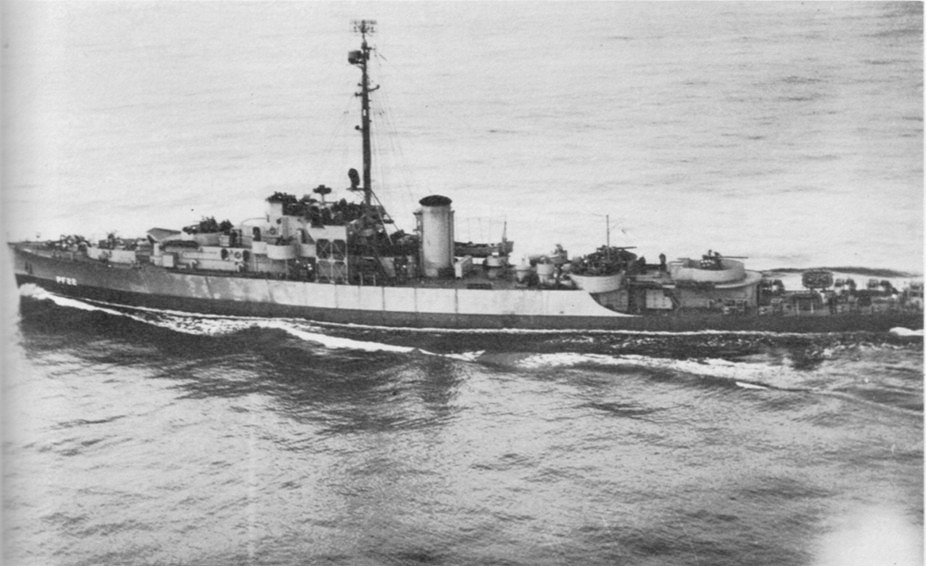
- USS Gloucester (PF-22)

History

United States
- Name: Gloucester (PG-130)
- Namesake: City of Gloucester, Massachusetts
- Builder: Walter Butler Shipbuilding Company, Superior, Wisconsin
- Yard number: 19
- Laid down: 4 March 1943
- Reclassified: PF-34, 15 April 1943
- Launched: 12 July 1943
- Sponsored by: Mrs. Emily K. Ross
- Commissioned: 10 December 1943
- Decommissioned: 3 September 1945
- Fate: Transferred to Soviet Navy, 4 September 1945
- Acquired: Returned by Soviet Navy, 31 October 1949
- Recommissioned: 11 October 1950
- Decommissioned: 15 September 1952
- Fate: Transferred to Japan Maritime Self-Defense Force, 1 October 1953
- Stricken: 1 December 1961
- Acquired: Returned by Japan Maritime Self-Defense Force, 31 March 1969
- Fate: Final disposition unknown

Soviet Union
- Name: EK-26
- Acquired: 4 September 1945
- Commissioned: 4 September 1945
- Fate: Returned to United States, 31 October 1949

Japan
- Name: Tsuge
- Acquired: 1 October 1953
- Decommissioned: 31 March 1968
- Fate: Returned to United States, 31 March 1969

General characteristics
- Class & type: Tacoma-class frigate
- Displacement: 1,430 long tons (1,453 t) light; 2,415 long tons (2,454 t) full
- Length: 303 ft 11 in (92.63 m)
- Beam: 37 ft 11 in (11.56 m)
- Draft: 13 ft 8 in (4.17 m)
- Propulsion: 2 × 5,500 shp (4,101 kW) turbines; 3 boilers; 2 shafts
- Speed: 20 knots (37 km/h; 23 mph)
- Complement: 190
- Armament: 3 × 3"/50 dual purpose guns (3x1); 4 x 40 mm guns (2×2); 9 × 20 mm guns (9×1); 1 × Hedgehog anti-submarine mortar; 8 × Y-gun depth charge projectors; 2 × Depth charge tracks

USS Gloucester (PF-22), a Tacoma-class frigate in commission from 1943 to 1945, was the second ship of the United States Navy to be named for Gloucester, Massachusetts. She later served in the Soviet Navy as EK-26 and in the Japan Maritime Self-Defense Force as JDS Tsuge (PF-12) and JDS Tsuge (PF-292).

== Construction and commissioning ==
Gloucester, originally classified PG-130, was launched on 12 July 1943, at the Walter Butler Shipbuilding Company in Superior, Wisconsin, under a Maritime Commission contract, sponsored by Mrs. Emily K. Ross. The US Navy acquired and simultaneously commissioned the ship on 10 December 1943.

== Service history ==
=== U.S. Navy, World War II, 1943-1945 ===
Following shakedown, Gloucester was employed in training frigate crews at Galveston, Texas. On 16 June 1944 she was attached to Escort Division 38. Earmarked in 1945 for transfer to the Soviet Navy in Project Hula, a secret program for the transfer of U.S. Navy ships to the Soviet Navy in anticipation of the Soviet Union joining the war against Japan, Gloucester proceeded to Cold Bay in the Territory of Alaska in the late summer of 1945.

=== Soviet Navy, 1945–1949 ===
Following the completion of training for her new Soviet crew, Gloucester was decommissioned on 4 September 1945 at Cold Bay and transferred to the Soviet Union under Lend-Lease immediately along with her sister ships USS Newport (PF-27), USS Bath (PF-55), and USS Evansville (PF-70), the last of 28 patrol frigates transferred to the Soviet Navy in Project Hula. Commissioned into the Soviet Navy immediately, Gloucester was designated as a storozhevoi korabl ("escort ship") and renamed EK-26 in Soviet service.

On 5 September 1945, all ship transfers to the Soviet Union were ordered stopped, although training for ships already transferred was allowed to continue. Accordingly, EK-26 remained at Cold Bay along with EK-28 (ex-Newport), EK-29 (ex-Bath), and EK-30 (ex-Evanvsille) for additional shakedown and training until 17 September 1945, when all four ships departed in company bound for Petropavlovsk-Kamchatsky in the Soviet Union, the last four of the 149 Project Hula ships to do so. Arriving too late to see World War II combat with the Soviet Navy, EK-26 served as a patrol vessel in the Soviet Far East.

In February 1946, the United States began negotiations for the return of ships loaned to the Soviet Union for use during World War II. On 8 May 1947, United States Secretary of the Navy James V. Forrestal informed the United States Department of State that the United States Department of the Navy wanted 480 of the 585 combatant ships it had transferred to the Soviet Union for World War II use returned, EK-26 among them. Negotiations for the return of the ships were protracted, but on 31 October 1949 the Soviet Union finally returned EK-26 to the U.S. Navy at Yokosuka, Japan.

=== U.S. Navy, Korean War, 1950–1952 ===
Returning to her original name, Gloucester lay idle in the Pacific Reserve Fleet at Yokosuka until recommissioned on 11 October 1950 for service in the Korean War. She departed Yokosuka on 27 November 1950 bound for Korea and conducted patrol and anti-submarine warfare duties at Wonsan, Pusan, Inchon, and Kusan until returning to Yokosuka on 21 January 1951. Gloucester subsequently engaged in patrol and escort duties at Wonsan and saw combat on 18 June 1951, when with other ships, she blasted gun emplacements at Wonsan. She continued her duties in Korean waters through the fall of 1951. On 11 November 1951 while cruising off Kojo during a duel with shore batteries, Gloucester took a direct hit that killed Storekeeper Third Class Louis Jaramillo and wounded 11 others. Following repairs in Japan, she returned to Korean waters to continue support of United Nations forces ashore. Arriving at Yokosuka on 5 September 1952, she was decommissioned there on 15 September 1952.

=== Japan Maritime Self-Defense Force, 1953–1969 ===
The United States loaned Gloucester to Japan on 1 October 1953 for service in the Japan Maritime Self-Defense Force, where she served as JDS Tsuge (PF-12) (つげ (PF-12); "buxus microphylla"). Tsuge was redesignated PF-292 on 1 September 1957. The United States struck her from the Navy List on 1 December 1961 and transferred her to Japan outright in March 1962.

Japan decommissioned Tsuge on 31 March 1968 and returned her to U.S. custody on 31 March 1969 for disposal. Her final disposition is unknown.

== Awards ==
- Combat Action Ribbon
- American Campaign Medal
- World War II Victory Medal
- National Defense Service Medal
- Korean Service Medal with seven battle stars
- Korean Presidential Unit Citation
- United Nations Service Medal
- Korean Defense Service Medal (Korea)
