= Hause =

Hause is a surname. Notable people with the surname include:

- Dave Hause (born 1978), American singer-songwriter
- Evan Hause (born 1967), American composer, percussionist and conductor
- Kortney Hause (born 1995), English footballer
- Lothar Hause (born 1955), East German footballer
