= USS Bath (PF-55) =

Tacoma-class patrol frigate

History

United States
- Name: Bath
- Namesake: City of Bath, Maine
- Reclassified: PF-55, 15 April 1943
- Builder: Froemming Brothers, Inc., Milwaukee, and Pendleton Shipyards, New Orleans
- Laid down: 23 August 1943
- Launched: 14 November 1943
- Sponsored by: Mrs. Fred R. E. Dean
- Commissioned: 9 September 1944
- Decommissioned: 4 September 1945
- Fate: Transferred to Soviet Navy 4 September 1945
- Acquired: Returned by Soviet Navy, 15 November 1949
- Fate: Transferred to the Japan Maritime Self-Defense Force, 13 December or 23 December 1953
- Stricken: 1 December 1961

Soviet Union
- Name: EK-29
- Acquired: 4 September 1945
- Commissioned: 4 September 1945
- Fate: Returned to United States, 15 November 1949

Japan
- Name: Maki or JDS Matsu (PF-6)
- Acquired: By loan, 13 or 23 December 1953; By permanent transfer, 28 August 1962
- Decommissioned: 31 March 1966
- Renamed: YTE-9, 31 March 1966
- In service: 31 March 1966, as non-self-propelled pier-side training ship
- Fate: Sold for scrapping, 13 December 1971

General characteristics
- Class & type: Tacoma-class frigate
- Displacement: 1,430 long tons (1,453 t) light; 2,415 long tons (2,454 t) full
- Length: 303 ft 11 in (92.63 m)
- Beam: 37 ft 6 in (11.43 m)
- Draft: 13 ft 8 in (4.17 m)
- Propulsion: 2 × 5,500 shp (4,101 kW) turbines; 3 boilers; 2 shafts
- Speed: 20 knots (37 km/h; 23 mph)
- Complement: 190
- Armament: 3 × 3"/50 dual purpose guns (3x1); 4 x 40 mm guns (2×2); 9 × 20 mm guns (9×1); 1 × Hedgehog anti-submarine mortar; 8 × Y-gun depth charge projectors; 2 × Depth charge tracks

The second USS Bath (PF-55) was a United States Navy Tacoma-class frigate in commission from 1944 to 1945 which later served in the Soviet Navy as EK-29 and the Japanese Maritime Self-Defense Force, with her Japanese name reported by various sources (see below) as JDS Maki (PF-18) and JDS Maki (PF-298), and later as YTE-9.

== Construction and commissioning ==
Bath originally was authorized as a patrol gunboat with the hull number PG-163, but she was redesignated as a patrol frigate with the hull number PF-55 on 15 April 1943. She was laid down under a Maritime Commission contract as Maritime Commission Type T.S2-S2-AQ1 Hull 1480 on 23 August 1943 by Froemming Brothers, Inc., at Milwaukee. She was launched on 14 November 1943, sponsored by Mrs. Fred R. E. Dean, then moved in an incomplete state to New Orleans, where she was completed by Pendleton Shipyards. She was commissioned on 9 September 1944 with a United States Coast Guard crew.

== Service history ==
=== U.S. Navy, World War II, 1944-1945 ===
Bath departed New Orleans on 25 September 1944 and conducted her shakedown training out of Bermuda before proceeding to the Philadelphia Navy Yard in Philadelphia, Pennsylvania, where she arrived on 1 November 1944 for post-shakedown repairs and alterations. Sea trials off Rockland, Maine, and further repairs at Philadelphia followed before she departed the Delaware Capes on 30 December 1944 and proceeded to New York City to report for duty with Task Group 20.9 under the Commander, Eastern Sea Frontier.

Based at the Eastern Sea Frontier base at Tompkinsville, Staten Island, New York, and attached to Escort Division 38, Bath departed on 6 January 1945 in the escort of a convoy bound for Guantánamo Bay, Cuba, and returned to New York on 25 January 1945. She then operated out of Tompkinsville on antisubmarine barrier patrol through mid-May 1945, often in company with other patrol craft. She also kept approaching vessels from interfering with the convoy lanes into and out of New York.

Detached from this duty on 17 May 1945, Bath arrived at Ocean Weather Station 10 in the North Atlantic Ocean (at 36°00′00″N 070°00′00″W) on 18 May 1945 to relieve the destroyer escort USS Jack W. Wilke (DE-800) there, but was herself relieved the same day.

Returning to New York City, Bath underwent repairs and alterations at the Mariners' Harbor shipyard of the Bethlehem Steel Corporation on Staten Island, and received orders to the Pacific Ocean on 11 June 1945. On 13 July 1945, the Soviet Union and the United States agreed that she would be transferred to the Soviet Navy in Project Hula, a secret program for the transfer of U.S. Navy ships to the Soviet Navy under Lend-Lease at Cold Bay in the Territory of Alaska in anticipation of the Soviet Union joining the war against Japan. Accordingly, Bath set out for Cold Bay on 14 July 1945. She transited the Panama Canal on 22 July 1945 and reached San Pedro, California, on 30 July 1945. Proceeding on to Seattle, Washington, Bath departed for Cold Bay on 28 August 1945. Training of her new Soviet crew soon began.

=== Soviet Navy, 1945–1949 ===
Following the completion of training for her Soviet crew, Bath was decommissioned on 4 September 1945 at Cold Bay and transferred to the Soviet Union immediately along with her sister ships USS Gloucester (PF-22), USS Newport (PF-27), and USS Evansville (PF-70), the last of 28 patrol frigates transferred to the Soviet Navy in Project Hula. Commissioned into the Soviet Navy immediately, Bath was designated as a storozhevoi korabl ("escort ship") and renamed EK-29 in Soviet service.

On 5 September 1945, all ship transfers to the Soviet Union were ordered stopped, although training for ships already transferred was allowed to continue. Accordingly, EK-29 remained at Cold Bay along with EK-26 (ex-Gloucester), EK-28 (ex-Newport), and EK-30 (ex-Evanvsille) for additional shakedown and training until 17 September 1945. All four of these ships departed in company bound for Petropavlovsk-Kamchatsky in the Soviet Union, the last four of the 149 Project Hula ships to do so. Too late for World War II service with the Soviet Navy, EK-29 served as a patrol vessel in the Soviet Far East.

In February 1946, the United States began negotiations for the return of ships loaned to the Soviet Union for use during World War II. On 8 May 1947, United States Secretary of the Navy James V. Forrestal informed the United States Department of State that the United States Department of the Navy wanted 480 of the 585 combatant ships it had transferred to the Soviet Union for World War II use returned, EK-29 among them. Negotiations for the return of the ships were protracted, but on 15 November 1949 the Soviet Union finally returned EK-29 to the U.S. Navy at Yokosuka, Japan.

=== Japan Maritime Self-Defense Force, 1953–1971 ===
Reverting to her former name and placed out of commission in reserve at Yokosuka, Bath remained inactive there until loaned to the Japan Maritime Self-Defense Force (JMSDF) on either 13 or 23 December 1953. Sources disagree the JMSDF's name for the ship, variously reporting it as JDS Maki (PF-18) (まき (PF-18); "podocarpaceae") or JDS Matsu (PF-6) (まつ (PF-6); "pine tree"). She was redesignated JDS Maki (PF-298) on 1 September 1957.

On 1 December 1961, the U.S. Navy struck Bath's name from the U.S. Naval Vessel Register, and the United States transferred the ship to Japan permanently on 28 August 1962. On 31 March 1966, the JMSDF decommissioned the ship, simultaneously renamed her YTE-9, and placed in service as a non-commissioned pier-side training ship. She was sold to the Chin Ho Fa Steel and Iron Company, Ltd., of Taiwan on 13 December 1971 for scrapping.
