= USS Newport (PF-27) =

Tacoma-class patrol frigate

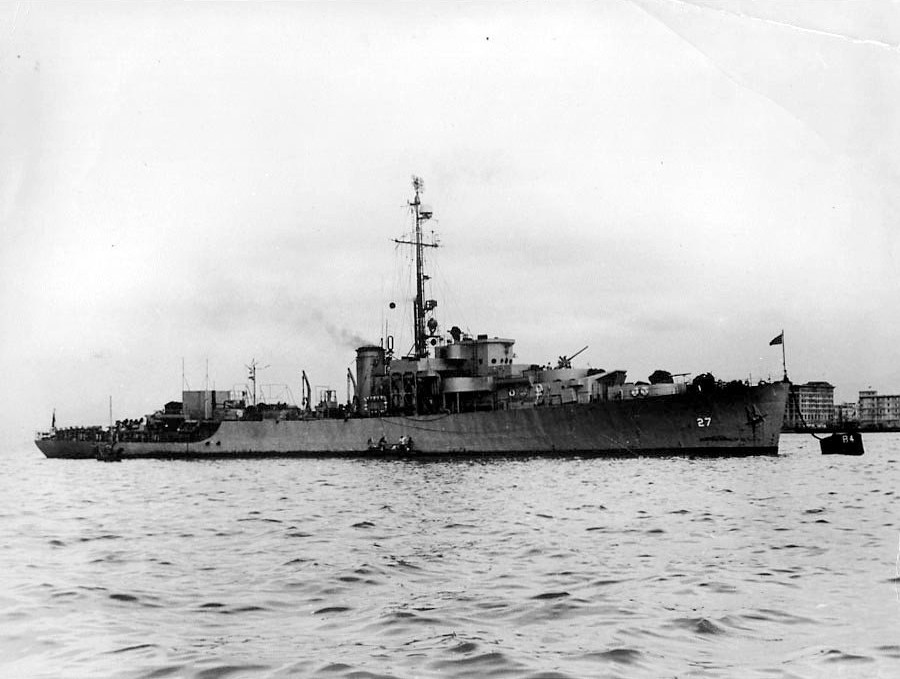

History

United States
- Name: Newport
- Namesake: City of Newport, Rhode Island
- Reclassified: PF-27, 15 April 1943
- Builder: Walter Butler Shipbuilding Company, Superior, Wisconsin
- Yard number: 24
- Laid down: 8 June 1943
- Launched: 15 August 1943
- Sponsored by: Mrs. Nicholas Brown
- Commissioned: 8 September 1944
- Decommissioned: 4 September 1945
- Fate: Transferred to Soviet Navy, 4 September 1945
- Acquired: Returned by Soviet Navy, 14 November 1949
- Recommissioned: 27 July 1950
- Decommissioned: 30 April 1952
- Fate: Transferred to Japan Maritime Self-Defense Force, 1 October 1953
- Stricken: 1 December 1961
- Acquired: Returned by Japan Maritime Self-Defense Force, 20 May 1975
- Fate: Final disposition unknown

Soviet Union
- Name: EK-28
- Acquired: 4 September 1945
- Commissioned: 4 September 1945
- Fate: Returned to United States, 14 November 1949

Japan
- Name: JDS Kaede (PF-293)
- Acquired: 1 October 1953
- Reclassified: PF-293, 1 September 1957
- Renamed: YAC-17, 31 March 1966
- Reclassified: Auxiliary stock craft (YAC), 31 March 1966
- Decommissioned: 31 March 1972
- Fate: Returned to United States, 20 May 1975

General characteristics
- Class & type: Tacoma-class frigate
- Displacement: 1,430 long tons (1,453 t) light; 2,415 long tons (2,454 t) full
- Length: 303 ft 11 in (92.63 m)
- Beam: 37 ft 6 in (11.43 m)
- Draft: 13 ft 8 in (4.17 m)
- Propulsion: 2 × 5,500 shp (4,101 kW) turbines; 3 boilers; 2 shafts
- Speed: 20 knots (37 km/h; 23 mph)
- Complement: 190
- Armament: 3 × 3"/50 dual purpose guns (3x1); 4 x 40 mm guns (2×2); 9 × 20 mm guns (9×1); 1 × Hedgehog anti-submarine mortar; 8 × Y-gun depth charge projectors; 2 × Depth charge tracks

USS Newport (PF-27), a Tacoma-class frigate in commission from 1944 to 1945, and from 1950 to 1952, was the second ship of the United States Navy to be named for the city of Newport, Rhode Island. She later served in the Soviet Navy as EK-28 and in the Japan Maritime Self-Defense Force as JDS Kaede (PF-13), JDS Kaede (PF-293) and as YAC-17.

== Construction and commissioning ==
Originally classified as a patrol gunboat, PG-135, Newport was reclassified as a patrol frigate, PF-46, on 15 April 1943. She was laid down by the Walter Butler Shipbuilding Company in Superior, Wisconsin, on 8 June 1943, and launched on 15 August 1943, sponsored by Mrs. Nicholas Brown. She was commissioned at New Orleans, Louisiana, on 8 September 1944.

== Service history ==
=== U.S. Navy, World War II, 1944-1945 ===
After shakedown at Bermuda, Newport proceeded from New York, New York, to Guantanamo Bay Naval Base, Cuba, on escort duty, returning on 24 February 1945 to Tompkinsville on Staten Island, New York, her home port for exercises and patrol off the United States East Coast until 9 July 1945.

Earmarked for transfer to the Soviet Navy in Project Hula, a secret program for the transfer of U.S. Navy ships to the Soviet Navy in anticipation of the Soviet Union joining the war against Japan, Newport steamed via the Panama Canal and Seattle, Washington, to Cold Bay in the Territory of Alaska to train her new Soviet crew.

=== Soviet Navy, 1945–1949 ===
Following the completion of training for her Soviet crew, Newport was decommissioned on 4 September 1945 at Cold Bay and transferred to the Soviet Union under Lend-Lease immediately along with her sister ships USS Gloucester (PF-22), USS Bath (PF-55), and USS Evansville (PF-70), the last of 28 patrol frigates transferred to the Soviet Navy in Project Hula. Commissioned into the Soviet Navy immediately, Newport was designated as a storozhevoi korabl ("escort ship") and renamed EK-28 in Soviet service.

On 5 September 1945, all ship transfers to the Soviet Union were ordered stopped, although training for ships already transferred was allowed to continue. Accordingly, EK-28 remained at Cold Bay along with EK-26 (ex-Gloucester), EK-29 (ex-Bath), and EK-30 (ex-Evanvsille) for additional shakedown and training until 17 September 1945, when all four ships departed in company bound for Petropavlovsk-Kamchatsky in the Soviet Union, the last four of the 149 Project Hula ships to do so. Too late for World War II service with the Soviet Navy, EK-28 served as a patrol vessel in the Soviet Far East.

In February 1946, the United States began negotiations for the return of ships loaned to the Soviet Union for use during World War II. On 8 May 1947, United States Secretary of the Navy James V. Forrestal informed the United States Department of State that the United States Department of the Navy wanted 480 of the 585 combatant ships it had transferred to the Soviet Union for World War II use returned, EK-28 among them. Negotiations for the return of the ships were protracted, but on 14 November 1949 the Soviet Union finally returned EK-28 to the U.S. Navy at Yokosuka, Japan.

=== U.S. Navy, Korean War, 1950–1953 ===
Reverting to her original name, Newport lay idle in the Pacific Reserve Fleet until recommissioned on 27 July 1950 for service in the Korean War. Lieutenant Commander P.A. Lilly became her recommissioning Commanding Officer. She patrolled off Inchon, Korea, from 15 to 26 September 1950, screening United Nations ships during the Inchon landings. Lilly recalled, "The extreme tides made for extreme currents and rip tides. When I went alongside an anchored tanker, I had to keep engines turning to stay alongside until fully moored. After the troops were safely ashore, we (escort ships) made our way back to Japan with the newly empty troop ships."

Newport then was converted for service as a weather ship, and so served on ocean weather stations in the Northwest Pacific Ocean until November 1951, when she took up varied duties off Korea, including screening underway replenishment groups, patrolling, and on 29 December 1951 conducting a shore bombardment at Wonsan. She next operated in the Philippine Islands until decommissioning at Yokosuka on 30 April 1952 and returning to a reserve status.

=== Japan Maritime Self-Defense Force, 1953–1975 ===
Loaned to Japan on 1 October 1953 for service in the Japan Maritime Self-Defense Force (JMSDF), the ship was commissioned as JDS Kaede (PF-13) (かえで (PF-13); "maple"). The JMSDF reclassified her as PF-293 on 1 September 1957. The U.S. Navy struck her from the U.S. Naval Vessel Register on 1 December 1961, and the United States transferred her to the JMSDF outright on 28 August 1962. Kaede was reclassified as an "auxiliary stock craft" (YAC) and renamed YAC-17 on 31 March 1966, serving thereafter as a non-operational training ship. Decommissioned on 31 March 1972, YAC-17 was returned to U.S. custody on 20 May 1975. Her final disposition is unknown.

== Awards ==
- American Campaign Medal
- Asiatic-Pacific Campaign Medal
- World War II Victory Medal
- China Service Medal
- National Defense Service Medal
- Korean Service Medal with four battle stars
- United Nations Service Medal
