= James P. Nichols =

American record producer

James P. Nichols is an American recording industry executive producer and master engineer.

== Education ==
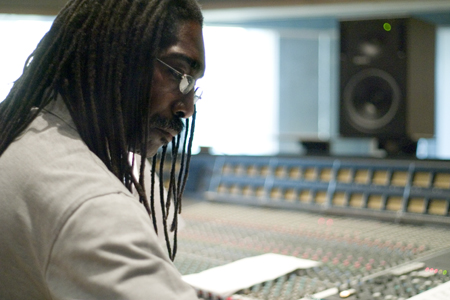
James P. Nichols - Master Recording Engineer

Nichols' involvement in the recording industry began in 1973 when after studying recording at The New School for Social Research, he obtained an Assistant Engineer position at A1 Studios in New York City, where he worked for two years under Herb Abramson, one of the founders of Atlantic Records. He then moved on in 1975, to Sound Mixers, which was primarily a jingle studio recording Burger King and Volkswagen 30 second spots in the day and dance records at night. He then worked for Electric Lady Studios where most notably he assisted, engineered, and performed with The Clash on the Sandinista! album. He is credited under the alias "J. P. Nicholson".

He continued his education enrolling at New York Technical College studying Electronics for Communications, Prototype Fabrications and Microprocessors. After graduation, he rekindled old associations in the industry and landed a job at A&R Studios home of Phil Ramone in 1980. Encouraged to record, one of his "Weekend Album Projects" was the first Boogie Down Productions LP on B-Boy Records with Scott La Rock and KRS-One. The single "The Bridge Is Over" remains par for Rap Hip-Hop’s historical course.

A&R Studios is also where he gained his first experiences in music/film engineering and lockup. In 1982 he went to work as a systems prototype fabricator with TimeLine Inc. headed by Gerry Block, formerly studio head for Sigma Sound Studios in New York City. There he built the first working prototype and proceeding first line of The Lynx Time Code Module, a staple device in studios worldwide.

== Career ==
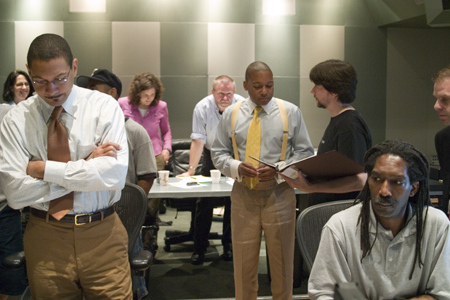
James P. Nichols - with Ken Burns, Wynton Marsalis, Delfeayo Marsalis at recording of the documentary: "World War II"

Because of his experience with the Lynx, RCA Recording Studios hired him in 1984. The studios, whose history was in Broadway cast recordings, wanted to become a presence in large-scale orchestra film scoring in New York. RCA Recording soon became the major scoring stage on the east coast and there he was promoted to Master Engineer which led to his working as Scoring Engineer, Recording Engineer, and Mastering Engineer for Jazz, Broadway, and Classical products. One of his pinnacle works with RCA/BMG Studios was the recording, mixing, and mastering of the audio for the Motion Picture Malcolm X, by film director Spike Lee in 1992.

In 1996, after a previous three nominations, he won a Grammy Award for “Best Historical Recording” of “The Jascha Heifetz Collection”. Also in 1996 he moved on to Manhattan Center Studios, New York, as a producer/engineer. He completed several projects, including Ed Wood, starring Johnny Depp, and The Butcher Boy, featuring the music of critically acclaimed composer Elliot Goldenthal, as well as The Pat McGuire Band for Inverin Records.

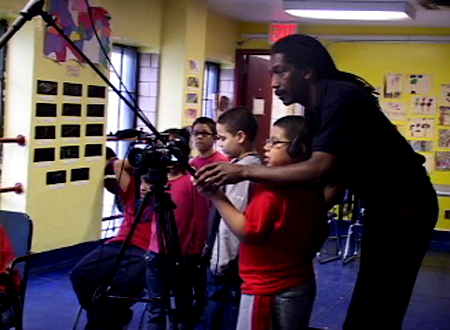
James P. Nichols - teaching next generation sound and broadcast for New York Parks

Again in 1997 he received a Producer Grammy nomination for the Broadway hit “Bring in 'Da Noise, Bring in 'Da Funk” for RCA Victor.

In 2000, he traveled the world creating live sound environments with the Nicholas Payton Quintet and Big Band Orchestra. He also heads an organization founded by himself, entitled “Commercial Free Jazz” whose function as an institution is to support and provide a platform for experimentation in recording and helping artists worldwide realize the potential of their work.

In 2005, Nichols began the next phase of his career by expanding the bounds of his sonic expertise as a Film Applications Engineer for Dolby Laboratories.

In 2008, Nichols became an off Broadway Executive Producer of performance art Operas "Madwoman: A Contemporary Opera", "Femme Fractale: An Opera of Reflection", and "Mon Electro Magnetisme: An Opera on Attraction" all written & performed by Mem Nahadr.
