= USS Evansville (PF-70) =

Tacoma-class patrol frigate

History

United States
- Name: Evansville
- Namesake: City of Evansville, Indiana
- Reclassified: PF-70, 15 April 1943
- Builder: Leathem D. Smith Shipbuilding Company, Sturgeon Bay, Wisconsin
- Yard number: 313
- Laid down: 28 August 1943
- Launched: 27 November 1943
- Sponsored by: Mrs. Don Davis
- Commissioned: 4 December 1944
- Decommissioned: 4 September 1945
- Fate: Transferred to the Soviet Navy, 4 September 1945
- Acquired: Returned by Soviet Navy, 1949
- Recommissioned: 29 July 1950
- Decommissioned: 28 February 1953
- Fate: Transferred to Japan Maritime Self-Defense Force, 31 October 1953
- Acquired: Returned by Japan Maritime Self-Defense Force, 15 October 1976
- Fate: Scrapped, 1977

Soviet Union
- Name: EK-30
- Acquired: 4 September 1945
- Commissioned: 4 September 1945
- Fate: Returned to United States, 1949

Japan
- Name: Keyaki
- Acquired: 31 October 1953
- Renamed: YAC-21, 1970
- Reclassified: Auxiliary stock craft (YAC), 1970
- Decommissioned: 31 March 1976
- Fate: Returned to United States, 15 October 1976

General characteristics
- Class & type: Tacoma-class frigate
- Displacement: 1,430 long tons (1,453 t) light; 2,415 long tons (2,454 t) full
- Length: 303 ft 11 in (92.63 m)
- Beam: 37 ft 6 in (11.43 m)
- Draft: 13 ft 8 in (4.17 m)
- Propulsion: 2 × 5,500 shp (4,101 kW) 4 cylinder reciprocating steam engines; 3 boilers; 2 shafts
- Speed: 17 knots (31 km/h; 20 mph)
- Complement: 190
- Armament: 3 × 3"/50 dual purpose guns (3x1); 4 x 40 mm guns (2×2); 9 × 20 mm guns (9×1); 1 × Hedgehog anti-submarine mortar; 8 × Y-gun depth charge projectors; 2 × Depth charge tracks

USS Evansville (PF-70), a Tacoma-class frigate in commission from 1944 to 1945 and from 1950 to 1953, was the second ship of the United States Navy to be named for Evansville, Indiana. She also served in the Soviet Navy as EK-30 and in the Japan Maritime Self-Defense Force as JDS Keyaki (PF-15), JDS Keyaki (PF-295) and YAC-21.

== Construction and commissioning ==
Evansville was launched on 27 November 1943, by the Leathem D. Smith Shipbuilding Company at Sturgeon Bay, Wisconsin, sponsored by Mrs. Don Davis, daughter of the Mayor of Evansville, Indiana. She was commissioned on 4 December 1944.

== Service history ==
=== U.S. Navy, World War II, 1944-1945 ===
Evansville steamed down the Mississippi River and after calling at Mobile, Alabama, reached Charleston, South Carolina, on 31 December 1944. Through the next six months, she had escort duty along the United States East Coast and to Bermuda, patrolled off New York, and served briefly as a weather ship on ocean weather stations.

Earmarked for transfer to the Soviet Navy in Project Hula, a secret program at Cold Bay in the Territory of Alaska for the transfer of U.S. Navy ships to the Soviet Navy in anticipation of the Soviet Union joining the war against Japan, Evansville departed New York City on 9 July 1945, transited the Panama Canal, and steamed to San Diego, California and Seattle, Washington, before proceeding to Cold Bay. Training of her new Soviet crew soon began.

=== Soviet Navy, 1945–1949 ===
Following the completion of training for her Soviet crew, Evansville was decommissioned on 4 September 1945 at Cold Bay and transferred to the Soviet Union under Lend-Lease immediately along with her sister ships USS Gloucester (PF-22), USS Newport (PF-27), and USS Bath (PF-55), the last of 28 patrol frigates transferred to the Soviet Navy in Project Hula. Commissioned into the Soviet Navy immediately, Newport was designated as a storozhevoi korabl ("escort ship") and renamed EK-30 in Soviet service.

On 5 September 1945, all ship transfers to the Soviet Union were ordered stopped, although training for ships already transferred was allowed to continue. Accordingly, EK-30 remained at Cold Bay along with EK-26 (ex-Gloucester), EK-28 (ex-Newport), and EK-29 (ex-Bath) for additional shakedown and training until 17 September 1945, when all four ships departed in company bound for Petropavlovsk-Kamchatsky in the Soviet Union, the last four of the 149 Project Hula ships to do so. Too late for World War II service with the Soviet Navy, EK-30 served as a patrol vessel in the Soviet Far East.

In February 1946, the United States began negotiations for the return of ships loaned to the Soviet Union for use during World War II. On 8 May 1947, United States Secretary of the Navy James V. Forrestal informed the United States Department of State that the United States Department of the Navy wanted 480 of the 585 combatant ships it had transferred to the Soviet Union for World War II use returned, EK-30 among them. Negotiations for the return of the ships were protracted, but in October or November 1949 the Soviet Union finally returned EK-30 to the U.S. Navy at Yokosuka, Japan.

=== U.S. Navy, Korean War, 1950–1953 ===
Reverting to her original name, Evansville lay idle in the Pacific Reserve Fleet at Yokosuka until the U.S. Navy recommissioned her for service in the Korean War on 29 July 1950. During the war, she patrolled out of Yokosuka and in Korean waters until decommissioned on 28 February 1953.

=== Japan Maritime Self-Defense Force, 1953–1976 ===
On 31 October 1953, the ship was transferred under the Mutual Defense Assistance Program to Japan for service in the Japan Maritime Self-Defense Force, which she served as JDS Keyaki (PF-15) (けやき (PF-15); "zelkova serrata"). The JMSDF reclassified her as PF-295 on 1 September 1957. Reclassified as an "auxiliary stock craft" (YAC) and renamed YAC-21, the ship was decommissioned on 31 March 1976 and returned to U.S. custody on 15 October 1976 for disposal. She was scrapped in 1977.
