= Randolph Coleman =

American composer (1937–2025)

Randolph 'Randy' Coleman (July 20, 1937 – April 24, 2025) was an American composer and educator. He was the first chairman of the national council of the American Society of University Composers, now called The Society of Composers, Inc.

== Biography ==
Coleman was raised in Charlottesville, Virginia. He wanted to be a composer as a teenager and studied at the University of Virginia before completing Bachelor's, Master's and Doctoral work at Northwestern University.

Coleman spent the majority of his career at the Oberlin Conservatory of Music at Oberlin College, teaching composition and classes on intersections in the arts for 43 years.

Among his students at Oberlin were Kyle Gann, Christopher Rouse, Greg Saunier, Evan Hause, Wally Scharold, Du Yun and Brenda Way. He also worked with then students Bill Irwin and Julie Taymor as part of the InterArts program Coleman founded at Oberlin in the 1970s.

Coleman died in April 2025.

== Music ==
Coleman said he was trying to move on from his roots in late modernism.

=== Awards and commissions ===
Coleman had commissioned work performed by a variety of ensembles including the Brooklyn Philharmonic (1984) and eighth blackbird. The Fromm Music Foundation commissioned Coleman to write a work for the first American Music Festival at Tanglewood in 1964 (Concerto for Piano and Chamber Orchestra).

He received a Fulbright fellowship which took him to Paris and Mexico. Early in his career his work received awards from the International Society of Contemporary Music in 1962 and 1963. In 2002 he was awarded a residency at The Rockefeller Institute of Bellagio, Italy as well as an Ohio Arts Council Individual Artist's Award.
