= Gary Heidt =

American musician (born 1970)

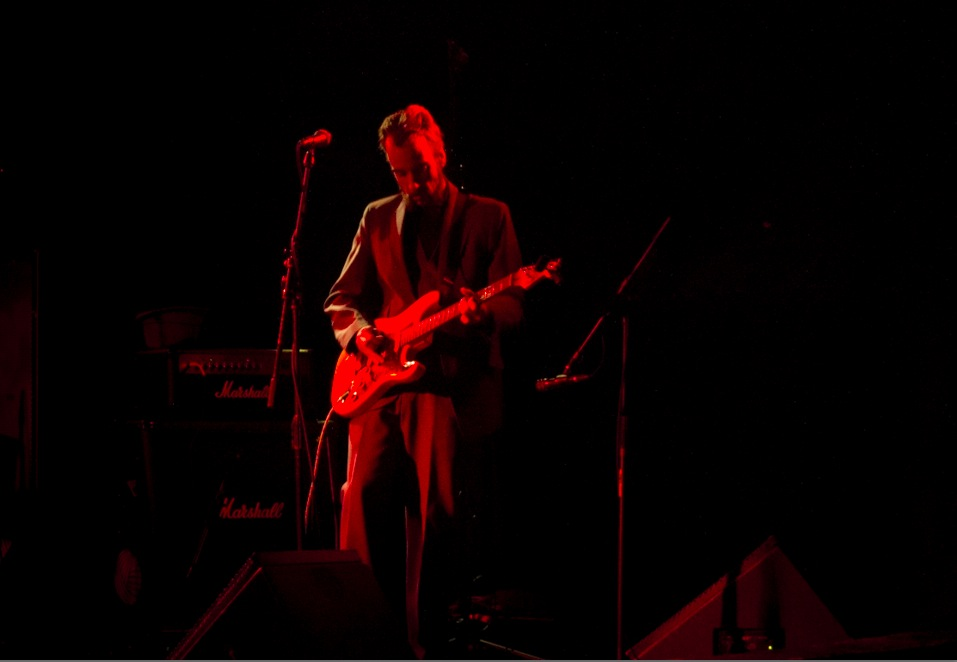
Gary Heidt at the Knitting Factory, Brooklyn, January 9, 2013. Photo by Jordan Hollander.

Gary Heidt (born Houston, Texas 1970) is a conceptual artist, experimental poet, musician, librettist, literary agent, and co-founder of Lovesphere, a 67-year performance project initiated in 1996, and more recently, the Perceiver of Sound League.

== Biography and career ==
Heidt was described as a "hyper-productive experimentalist" with a "Janus-figure element" to his work on the fringes of music, writing and visual art.

Heidt was born in Houston, Texas. From 1986 to 1988 he was lead singer for Devil Donkey, which also included Erik Amlee (guitar) and Enrique Gualberto Ramirez (bass). In 1991 he cofounded the Mammals of Zod with Raymond Seraphim Porter, Scott Wilcox and Chris Grace.

At Columbia College he was Station Manager of WKCR-FM from 1992 to 1993. In 1992 his experimental poem cycle "Moo Goo Gai Pain" was published in D. R. Heiniger's Private Arts. In 1994 he moved to Austin, where he produced the Mammals of Zod CD Kill The Humans which Village Voice critic Richard Gehr dubbed a "masterpiece." He returned to NYC and started an improvising collective using the name Mammals of Zod; core members included beatboxer Kid Lucky, Mem Nahadr, Sabir Mateen, Daniel Carter, Lipbone Redding (then known as CitiZen One), Emmallyea Swon-Young, Matthew Heyner (of the No-Neck Blues Band), Gary Miles and Ira Atkins. This group played frequently at clubs in NYC in the late 1990s, including CBGB's, The Cooler, The Continental, ABC No Rio and The Pyramid. Heidt posed shirtless for Paper Magazine's 1998 "Beautiful People" issue. During this period Heidt also wrote the columns "From the Priest Factory" and "The Gnostic Eye" which ran in the Religious Observer and its successor, Deolog.

With CitiZen One and Metal Tiger Technologies, Heidt started the 67-year performance project Lovesphere in 1996 with a 36-hour improvised musical at the Museum of Sound Recording. Metal Tiger Technologies streamed the entire piece on the Web in a very early implementation of this technology. Four tracks from this event formed the core of the second Mammals of Zod CD, L'of. "With multi-instrumentalist Gary Heidt as unofficial ringleader, it's an enclave that draws upon improvisation and performance art as a means to promote its socio-musical vision." In an interview with the East End Beacon, 'Mr. Heidt describes LoveSphere as “a sphere inscribed in time in an embroidery of sound which can only be witnessed from a higher dimension. However, we can see its stitches.”'

From 2003 to 2005 Lovesphere presented musical theater, which Heidt cowrote with Gary Miles, Nathan Metz et al., including "Feng Shui Assassin."

Lovesphere 21 (and subsequent festivals) took place in Greensboro, North Carolina and featured Lawrence "Lipbone" Redding, Mark Engebretson, and guitar virtuoso Eugene Chadbourne. Of Lovesphere 23, critic Lauren Barber wrote, "the 23rd annual Lovesphere (is a) creative-arts performance project devised to usher in the vernal equinox... one of the festival’s core values (is) deep listening."

Heidt wrote three librettos for composer Evan Hause's Defenstration Trilogy. Heidt's "engrossing " script for the second opera, Nightingale: The Last Days of James Forrestal "reflects, in accurate historical detail, on the political backstage manoeuvres that led to Forrestal's fall and on the dark side of his death....and can be considered a new chapter of its reception." Poems appeared in Intervalsss: The poems and Words of Musicians (ed. Steve Dalachinsky) and his first published crossword poem in John M. Bennett's Lost and Found Times. He worked as a theater administrator for Crystal Field's Theater for the New City and Barbara Vann's Medicine Show.

In 2003 he joined Imprint Agency, a literary agency in New York City. After a stint at Peter Rubie's FinePrint Literary Agency he started Signature Literary Agency with Ellen Pepus. He represents the Church of the SubGenius, Charles Yu, Benjamin Whitmer, Jeremy Bushnell, William Gillespie, Rob Klara, Jason Henderson and Chris Carter among others.

In 2006 Heidt was canonized by the Church of the SubGenius.

== Visual Poetry ==
In 2010 Fence published four more of his crossword poems, poems that can be read both across and down. Heidt gave a talk on alternate poetic forms in Spring of 2011 at the New York Public Library. In 2013 Infinity's Kitchen published "The Wordsquare," a historical analysis of his predecessors in this art form, including the Formists and their successors the recreational linguists.

Heidt showed an exhibit of crossword poems constrained by images at Spirols Gallery in Saugerties, NY in 2015. "Some of Heidt’s poems look a little like the letters from an intense game of Scrabble or a crazed crossword rendered on a canvas, hand-drawn (some blocky and dark, some wispy and tiny) — like the colorful cells of a Chuck Close portrait, where each component functions like a square on a grid, making a big mosaic-like picture of letters and words, one that you can look at as writing or as an image, depending on your distance and frame of mind," said Winston-Salem critic John Adamian.

A second show, Skull Form, took place at the Code Gallery in Greensboro in 2018. Lauren Barber wrote, "His poems lay within 23-by-29 letter grids, the single-word titles at the summit of the crown and the body of the text descending into the shadowy caverns of eye sockets toward the closed mandible, following whatever path the beholder’s eyes take. The experience is a bit like a choose-your-own-adventure story... The remarkable precision of finer-lined letters is juxtaposed with bold, somewhat frenzied lettering where shadows fall. What is striking about Heidt’s skull-based series is this tension between systems and anarchy; he devises a scrupulously ordered chaos the viewer instinctively seeks to make meaning of — this, through a form simultaneously universal and individual."

== Fist of Kindness ==
Heidt is a member of NYC band Fist of Kindness, "a country-inflected ensemble that defies convention by throwing in the odd fifth note into its arrangements," and performs and wrote all of the songs on their three albums, The Dead and the Powerless (2010), Ponderin' with the Fist of Kindness (2011). The Thirteen Repentances of the Pistis Sophia (2012) included songs by Cassandra Chopourian. Fist of Kindness released two albums in 2015; the lyrics for all 16 songs on Electric Objects are adapted from the writings of Gertrude Stein, while Chopourian wrote the songs on The Beast Within. Fist of Kindness has been described alternately as "an art rock ensemble masquerading as a country western band" and as "edgy literate Tom Waits-ish alt-country rockers." Composer Noah Creshevsky used samples from The Dead and the Powerless to create his composition "The Kindness of Strangers."

== Tender Buttons ==
With Cassandra Victoria Chopourian, Heidt started creating performances from Gertrude Stein's Tender Buttons in 2010. They performed parts of this opus in London and the sister cities of Leipzig, Germany and Houston, Texas; as well as New York City and Jersey City. Heidt also composed music for the Van Reipen Collective's Shelly's Spherical Journey, which was first presented as part of Lovesphere 15.

TENDER BUTTONS: OBJECTS FOOD ROOMS premiered at Theater for the New City in October 2014 on the centennial of the publication of its source text. The five-hour performance was divided into three parts; Heidt was dramaturg for all three and director of OBJECTS. Heidt staged OBJECTS as a comic operetta for 12 performers. OBJECTS was set inside a human aquarium populated by incestuous gentlepeople, a well-trained nursing staff, an AWOL soldier and his amphibious fiancée. Heidt's treatment of the text emphasized kabbalistic-phenomenological themes and the ongoing exorcism of patriarchy. Critic Lana Adler claimed that 'aided by the melodious, sometimes folksy, sometimes ambient, and sometimes ecstatic live music (arranged by Fist of Kindness) and the skilled, nuanced, and passionate singing and movement work of the actors, the viewer moves into what is at once a deeper and more vague process of experiencing the performance as it comes at them. This aim, it could be argued, is shared by all devotedly cubist work.' Stein scholar Karren LaLonde Alenier called OBJECTS "a troubadour-like entertainment where... music-making, song-singing, odd choreography kicked my subconscious into another realm."

== Perceiver of Sound League ==
To incorporate a legal entity for Lovesphere, Gary Heidt incorporated Perceiver of Sound League as a religious organization under the laws of New Jersey. Heidt started a Perceiver of Sound League concert series at Glenwood Community Bookshop in Greensboro with a concert by Sanders Davis, a Crystal Bright sideman, in December 2015. The series continues the third Saturday of every month at 4pm. Heidt also hosts a Perceiver of Sound League radio show on radio station WUAG (and sometimes WQFS) playing music by idiosyncratic American originals like Sun Ra, Conlon Nancarrow, John Cage and Ornette Coleman. in Greensboro.
