= Evan Hause =

American musician (born 1967)

Evan Hause (born 1967) is an American composer, percussionist and conductor. Hause has composed over one hundred works ranging from rock music to opera.

== Biography and career ==
After growing up in Greenville, North Carolina, he earned the Doctor of Music Arts and Master of Music degrees in composition from the University of Michigan, and the Bachelor of Music degree from the Oberlin Conservatory in composition and percussion, where he was awarded the Herbert Elwell Award. He attended the North Carolina School of the Arts as a percussionist. He studied composition with Sherwood Shaffer, Randolph Coleman, Richard Hoffmann (at the Schoenberg Haus in Moedling, Austria, in an Oberlin abroad program), William Albright, William Bolcom and Leslie Bassett, among others. He has been commissioned by the Albany Symphony Orchestra, Riverside Symphony Orchestra, Pittsburgh New Music Ensemble, Tales & Scales, Alarm Will Sound, University of Michigan School of Music, Theater, and Dance, and the Carolina Chamber Music Festival. He has been awarded residencies at the MacDowell Colony, Atlantic Center for the Arts, the Aspen Music Festival, June in Buffalo and the Edward Albee "Barn" at Montauk, NY.

Hause has composed over one hundred and fifty compositions for standard and non-standard instrumentations, including solo instruments, chamber groups, orchestra, band, chorus, rock band, big band, and opera. He has set to music the poetry of D. H. Lawrence, James Joyce, Hugh Ogden, Adrienne Rich, W. B. Yeats and himself. He created three chamber operas with the librettist Gary Heidt called "The Defenestration Trilogy" and four "mini-operas" for the Dogs of Desire (a satellite ensemble from the Albany Symphony). He has a catalog of some 120 rock songs, released internationally on in various formats, usually with Hause playing and singing all parts. He made two arrangements for the New York-based ensemble, Alarm Will Sound. The first, Aphex Twin's "Omgyjya Switch 7" was performed at the Lincoln Center Festival on July 24, 2005, and was released on Cantaloupe Records on the CD Acoustica. The second, of Edgard Varèse's Poème Électronique, was premiered at Columbia University's Miller Theater on January 20, 2007. As a freelance arranger he has created scores and arrangements for composers George Tsontakis and Paquito D'Rivera.

Hause studied percussion with James Massie Johnson, Jr., Michael Rosen, Michael Udow, and Salvatore Rabbio. After youthful accolades such as being named timpanist of the North Carolina All-State Band and Orchestra, and an award from the Brevard Music Center, he earned the Terry Sanford Scholarship to the University of North Carolina School of the Arts. He has played in the North Carolina, Greensboro, Winston-Salem, Charleston (SC), Flint (MI), Ann Arbor, and Long Island (NY) Symphonies, among others. As a contemporary music percussionist he has played with the Locrian Chamber Players and the S.E.M. Ensemble.

As an electric guitarist he appeared on the Alarm Will Sound CD Acoustica, in performances of his own Concerto for Electric Guitar and Symphony Band with the bands of the Universities of Michigan and Florida, and on the Cadence jazz CD, Tony's Blues with poet Barry Wallenstein and pianist John Hicks. As a pianist he accompanied the off-off-Broadway revival of Mae West's Sex for the Hourglass Group at the Gershwin Theater in New York City (1999–2000).

As an educator, Hause taught percussion at the North Carolina Governor's School West in 1991; theory, composition and percussion at Pittsburg State University in Kansas in from 1996 to 1999; electronic music composition at Drew University; and theory at Concordia College in Bronxville, New York, from 2003 to 2005.

Hause was the general manager for the Edward B. Marks Music Company from 2005 to 2018. In this capacity he oversaw publications by composers William Bolcom, Kenneth Fuchs, and Curtis Curtis-Smith, Roger Sessions, Mario Davidovsky, the Cuban composers Ernesto Lecuona and Gonzalo Roig, and others.

== The Defenestration Trilogy ==
The trilogy consists of : On The Air (2001), originally premiered as The Birth and Theft of Television on March 26–27, 2001 at the Theater for the New City, Nightingale: The Last Days of James Forrestal (2002), premiered May 19-June 4, 2002 at the Present Company Theatorium, and Man: Biology of a Fall (2007), premiered October 4–7, 2007 at Kumble Theater of Long Island University, Brooklyn Campus. Each work sets a libretto by Gary Heidt, employs a cast of approximately 10 singers, and employs an orchestra of 7-15 players.

The Birth and Theft of Television is a fictional interweave of the travails of the two great American inventors, Philo T. Farnsworth (inventor of television) and Edwin H. Armstrong (inventor of F.M.), and their battles against corporate America, consolidated into the personage of David Sarnoff (CEO of RCA), leading up to Armstrong's suicide by self-defenestration in 1954.

Nightingale: The Last Days of James Forrestal is an imagined glimpse into the mind of the first U.S. Secretary of Defense in his final six weeks of life (1949) as he underwent treatment for nervous exhaustion in the 16th floor of the Bethesda Naval Hospital. Among the characters who visit him are Harry Truman, Sidney Souers, his wife Josephine, and Lyndon B. Johnson before Forrestal dies by falling from his window.

Man: Biology of a Fall is a similar glimpse into unknowable events surrounding the last week of life of Frank Olson, a biochemist who is believed to have been murdered in 1953 by defenestration. The backdrop of this opera is Fort Detrick, the CIA's MK-ULTRA mind control program, Greenwich Village, and the Statler Hotel in New York City. Other characters drawn from real persons include Sidney Gottlieb, William Sargant, and George Hunter White.

== Major works ==
- RKJVL's New Idea (1989), for violin and marimba
- Fields (1991), for marimba solo
- Chamber Symphony (1993), for chamber orchestra
- Concerto for Marimba and Orchestra in One Movement (1994)
- The Ship of Death (Symphony No. 1) (1996), for orchestra, chorus, and soloists
- Adventures of Freddy (1998), eclectic rock album
- Concerto for Electric Guitar and Symphony Band (2000)
- U.S. Lowball (2000), for chamber orchestra and vocalists
- Trumpet Concerto (2001), for trumpet and orchestra/band
- The Defenestration Trilogy (2000–2007), three chamber operas
- Spectral Caravan (2002), for four-hand piano
- Halcyon Shores (2003), for flute, violin, cello, and harp
- Motion Sonata (2005), for oboe, bassoon, and piano
- Nassau (2005–2011), for chamber orchestra and vocalists
- Struggle (2006) for solo trombone
- Tango Variations (2009), for band
- The Snake River Manual of Style (2011), for alto saxophone and electric guitar
- The Tree Without End (2012), for orchestra
- The Four Winds (1985/2013), for young concert band
- Symphony No. 2 (1997–2016), for orchestra
- Piano Concerto (1990-2013), for piano and orchestra
- Melancolia (2016), musique concrète
- Windy Day Poem (2017), for soprano saxophone and piano
- Plastic Island Pentecost (2018), progressive rock concept album
- A Yeats Cycle (2020), for baritone voice and piano
- Branching: A Tree Symphony (2021), for symphony band
- The Two Trees (a Yeats setting) (2022), for mixed chorus, piano, and cello
- Janus Overture (2023), for orchestra
- Trinity (2023), digital electronic music
- Pleiades (2024), digital electronic music
- Cosmic Divan (2026), eclectic rock album

== Sources ==
- Galens, Judy, "A Subject Rich With Meaning", University of Michigan School of Music, Theater, and Dance news website, April 18, 2022
- Dalton, Joseph, "Dogs of Desire Bring Modern Flair", Albany Times Union, March 30, 2007
- Johnson, Martin, "Conspiracy Opera is a Hause Specialty", Newsday, June 4, 2004
- Kerner, Leighton, "In Review: Nightingale: The Last Days of James Forrestal" Opera News September, 2002
- Kessler, Jordan, "Hoses, Power Tools, and Water Cart" (Alarm Will Sound interview), www.popmatters.com, October 3, 2005
- Kozinn, Allan, "No Reason They Can't Be Medieval, Too", The New York Times, August 17, 2002
- Lockwood, Alan, "Imposing Thirds" The Brooklyn Rail, October, 2007
- Midgette, Anne, "Back to a Future Unmade: Glittering, Playful Varèse", The New York Times, January 27, 2007
- New York Press, "...a Conspiracy Theory opera...", May 21, 2002
- Tommasini, Anthony, "A Contemporary Chamber Group, and That's Exactly What It Means", The New York Times, August 27, 2001
