= Mem Nahadr =

American performance artist and musician

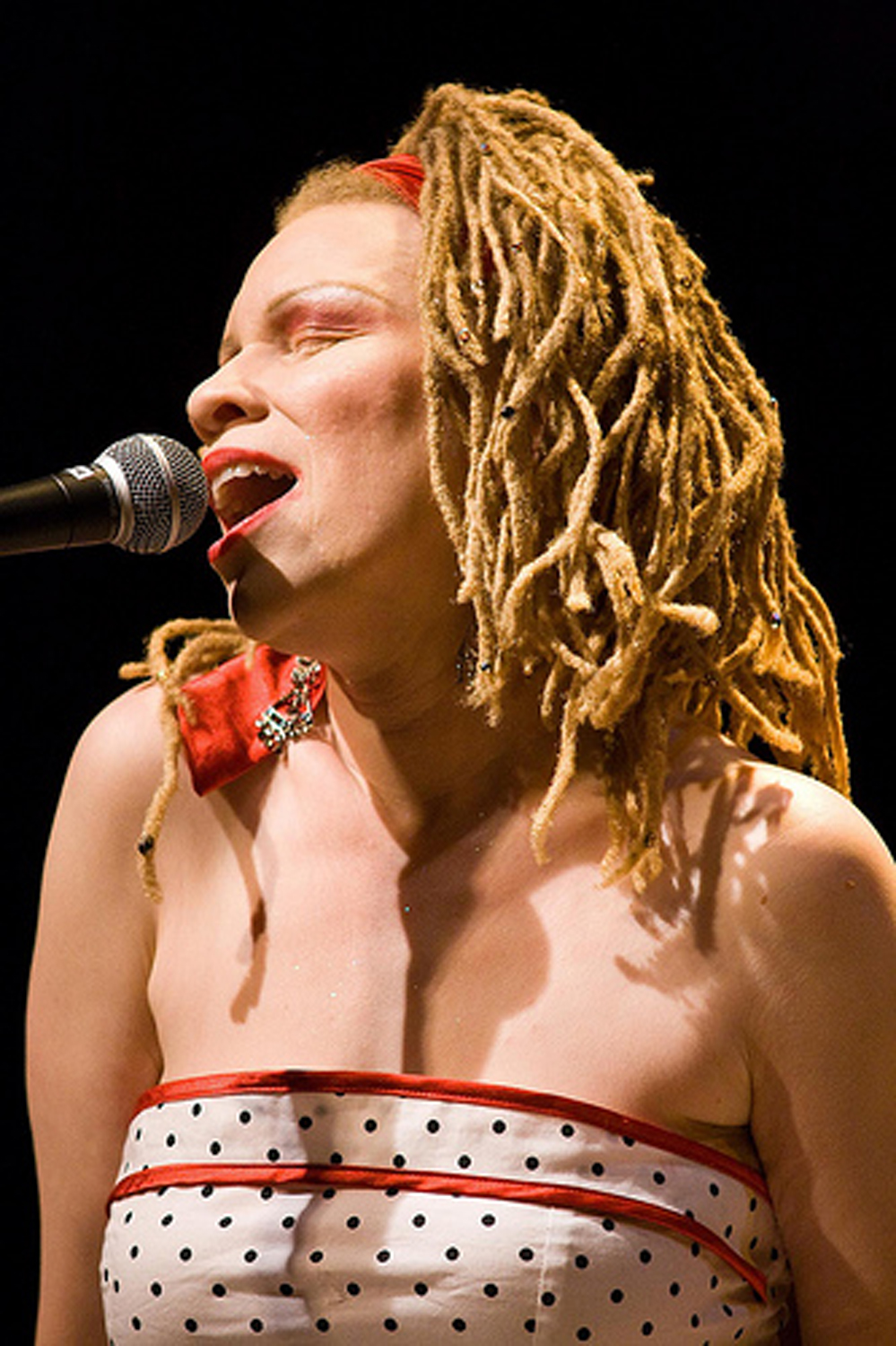
- Nahadr in Paris

Background information
- Genres: R&B; pop rock; jazz fusion; neo soul; pop; new-age; electronic; opera
- Occupations: Singer; songwriter; record producer; arranger; filmmaker; pianist; librettist; composer; musical director; music supervisor; executive producer; label president
- Instruments: Vocals; piano; percussion
- Years active: 1997–current
- Labels: Madwoman Multimedia
- Website: memnahadr.com

Mem Nahadr (/nəˈhɑːd/ nə-HAHD), also known as M. Nahadr and simply "M", is an American performance artist and multi-octave vocalist having access to the whistle register and best known for the performance of the song "Butterfly", composed by Yoko Kanno and lyricized by Chris Mosdell for Cowboy Bebop. In the recording studio, Nahadr writes, records, performs, and produces all of each project's music. She is co-produced by Grammy Award Winner, James P. Nichols. She is also an author, composer, poet, filmmaker, and human rights activist.

== Early life ==
Mem Nahadr was born with the genetic condition known as albinism from African American parents. Her parents discovered her love and natural understanding of music during a parent/teacher meeting at the age of five. She was discovered creating coherent improvised passages from her own imagination, on the class piano as the meeting was held at the opposite end of the classroom.

== Career ==
In 1999, Mem Nahadr created a music label to promoted her music and protect her interests. She named this company MADWOMAN MULTIMEDIA, as an acquaintance once commented, "You always work like a Madwoman!". She is the sole artist on this label.

In 2008, she presented her first off-Broadway theatrical production, Madwoman: A Contemporary Opera. co-produced by Grammy winner James P. Nichols, and Harvard LOEB Theater director, Claude E. Sloan, Jr.

Nahadr, being an albinistic African American, was requested in 2004 by National Geographic Magazine to have a portrait made of her by renowned photojournalist Robert Clark, to be included in an article on genetic inheritance, ideas of diversity and acceptance of difference. Later that year, the portrait and some of Nahadr's artistic work were included in the magazine's "Best of the Year" collection of images.

Another portrait of Nahadr travels internationally in the Positive Exposure exhibition (featuring many people with albinism and other genetic conditions) by notable fashion photographer and human rights activist Rick Guidotti. The collection was launched at the Smithsonian Institution during the Mapping of the Human Genome Celebration in 2000.

In 2009, Nahadr released her fifth studio album entitled EclecticIsM internationally, to critical acclaim. AMG/Billboard gave it 4 stars, while BBC Music presenter Kevin Le Gendre called it "The soul album of the year for its challenge to the genre itself".

In 2010, Nahadr was asked by legendary poet and playwright Ntozake Shange to compose a musical work for the soundtrack to the feature film adaptation of her iconic Broadway classic For Colored Girls Who Have Considered Suicide / When the Rainbow Is Enuf. This film was released by Lionsgate Entertainment, Hollywood, California.

Award-winning journalist Kevin Le Gendre included Nahadr extensively in his 2012 book Soul Unsung: Reflections on the Band in Black Popular Music.

Also in 2012, Nahadr embarked on a worldwide pilgrimage in order to study sound and healing techniques worldwide, from the U.S. through Europe to Asia. The project was entitled, LoM.

In March 2013, Nahadr began the creation of a new opera entitled FEMME FRACTALE - An Opera of Reflection, for the theater. James P. Nichols and Claude E. Sloan, Jr supported this presentation with co-production and state-of-the-art technical and creative design.

In April 2015, the second opus of her operatic work FEMME FRACTALE was released in audio form and began to be performed in theaters internationally again to critical acclaim. James Nadal from All About Jazz stated: "This record pushes the boundaries of where vocalization can go. This aptly named 'Opera of Reflection' is a determined and energetic project, depicting how positive energy can be channeled into music that is palatable yet vanguard, and realized with a cosmic message of confidence. Mem Nahadr is very much the modern woman who is savoring her role as a visionary artist, creating futuristic music for a contemporary audience that appreciates the effort it takes to accomplish something so imaginative."

In 2017, the third opus entitled FEMME FRACTALE 432 - An Opera of Reflection - The Celestial Resonance Opus 3 was submitted to The Recording Academy for Grammy consideration, and made the voting ballot in 13 categories over five musical genres.

Also in 2017, the aforementioned project on healing techniques through sound, entitled LoM was inevitably released.

In 2019, Nahadr began work on her third opera. This new work is entitled M.E.M. - "Mon Electro-Magnetisme": An Opera on Attraction.

== Discography ==
=== Albums ===
- 1999: Madwoman: A Contemporary Opera
- 2012: Eclecticism 432
- 2015: Femme Fractale: An Opera of Reflection
- 2017: FF 432 - An Opera of Reflection... The Celestial Resonance OPUS 3
- 2017: LoM 528 - GOLD
- 2024: Mon Elextro-Magnetisme: An Opera on Attraction

=== Singles ===
- 2010: I Found God In Myself - Ntozake's Song
- 2012: The Underground Aria 432 - CLUB MIX
- 2024: Another Like Me - from the Soundtrack of the Motion Picture "Indelible"
- 2024: M's Butterfly - Remix from the Soundtrack of the Motion Picture "Cowboy Bebop"

=== Album appearances ===
| Album | Year | Artist(s) | Record Label |
|---|---|---|---|
| "C'est Fou" | 1997 | Le Collage | Worldly Vibe |
| "Simple... Isn't It?" | 2003 | Earth People | Undivided Vision Records |
| "Mem" | 2008 | Mem | Mewai |
| "Two The Top" | 2017 | Onaje Alan Gumbs - featuring Mem Nahadr | Commercial Free Jazz |
| "Samsonite Gypsies" | 2018 | Samsonite Gypsies | SG Records |

== Theatre ==
| Year | Show | Role | Theater |
|---|---|---|---|
| 2008 | Madwoman: A Contemporary Opera ! | The Madwoman | Nuyorican Poets Cafe; August - October 2008 |
| 2015 | Femme Fractale - An Opera of Reflection ! | Femme | UForge Gallery; October 2015 |

== Filmography ==
| Year | Film | Role | Title |
|---|---|---|---|
| 2001 | Cowboy Bebop: The Movie | Performer | "Butterfly" |
| 2010 | For Colored Girls | Producer - Composer - Performer | "I Found God In Myself - Ntozake's Song" |
| 2014 | Indelible | Composer - Performer | "Another Like Me" |
| 2016 | Javelin: Soul Mining | Actress | Ms Lloyd |
