= Madwoman: A Contemporary Opera =

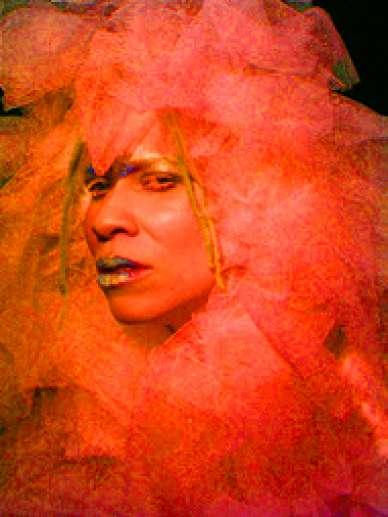
African American Performance Artist Mem Nahadr as "Madwoman"

Madwoman: A Contemporary Opera (also known as Madwoman) is an opera - performance art work created by the American performance artist and composer Mem Nahadr (also known as M). It depicts a series of compositions, "M-mination" from a woman with Albinism, deemed a "Madwoman" by society because of her depth of understanding and unconditional Self Acceptance. This art piece is presented in an interactive multimedia installation of space, UV light, 5.1 surround sound, items, images and concepts. This installation includes a one-woman live performance by Mem Nahadr, and stands as a sculptured interactive artpiece otherwise.

Supported by a team of artists and technicians, this presentation includes a multimedia system created by James P. Nichols, Broadway, Jazz and Grammy Award Winning Producer/Engineer; as well as Creative - Stage Direction by Claude E. Sloan, Jr., of the LOEB Drama Center Experimental Theater at Harvard, and the New York Shakespeare Festival at the Public Theater.

Album cover for the opera was photographed by the famed fashion photographer and Human Rights organizational founder, Rick Guidotti of Positive Exposure.

An excerpt from the Madwoman opera was performed before Queen Beatrix of Holland during the 25th annual Veerstichting Symposium at the St. Pieterskerk church in Lieden, The Netherlands.
