= Madman =

Madman or Mad Man may refer to:

== Film and television ==
- The Madman (film), a 1911 silent film
- Madman (1981 film), a horror film
- Madman (1978 film), an Israeli-German film
- Madman Entertainment, an Australian media distributor

== In print ==
- The Madman (book), a book by Kahlil Gibran
- The Mad Man, a novel by Samuel R. Delany
- Madman (Marvel Comics), a Hulk villain
- Madman (Mike Allred character), a superhero created by Mike Allred
- The Madman, an essay in Friedrich Nietzsche's The Gay Science

== Songs ==
- "Madman" (Beatles song), an unfinished 1969 song by John Lennon
- "Madman" (Cuddly Toys song), 1979
- "Mad Man", a song by Haste the Day from Dreamer
- "Mad Man", a song by the Hives from A.K.A. I-D-I-O-T
- "Madman", a song by Silverchair from Frogstomp

== People ==
- Ray Hedges, record producer
- Madman Muntz (1914–1987), American businessman and television pitchman
- Madman (rapper), stage name of Italian rapper Pierfrancesco Botrugno (born 1988)
- Madman Fulton, a ring name of American professional wrestler Jacob Southwick (born 1990)
- Mad Man Pondo, a ring name of American professional wrestler Kevin Canady (born 1969)

== See also ==
- Charles XII of Sweden, nicknamed "Madman of the North"
- Donald II of Scotland, nicknamed Dásachtach ("the Madman")
- Giampaolo Pazzini (born 1984), Italian footballer nicknamed Il Pazzo ("the Madman")
- Madman theory, a foreign policy concept used by U.S. President Richard Nixon
- Mad Men, an American TV show
- Madmen (DC Comics), a supervillain group
