= Rachel Carson (disambiguation) =

Rachel Carson (1907–1964) was a marine biologist and nature writer whose writings are credited with advancing the global environmental movement.

Rachel Carson may also refer to:

- Rachel Carson (film), an episode of American Experience series
- RV Rachel Carson (1977), a former naval gunboat, acquired by the Environmental Protection Agency in 1977 and later scrapped.
- RV Rachel Carson (2003), a former supply vessel, acquired by the Monterey Bay Aquarium Research Institute in 2011.
- RV Rachel Carson (2008), a Challenger-class research vessel, launched in 2008 and operated by the University of Maryland.
- Rachel Carson Bridge, a bridge across the Allegheny River in Pittsburgh, Pennsylvania
- Rachel Carson College, a residential college at the University of California, Santa Cruz
- Rachel Carson Greenway, a set of trails in Maryland
- Rachel Carson Middle School, in Virginia
- Rachel Carson National Wildlife Refuge, in Maine
- Rachel Carson Run, a tributary of the Allegheny River in Pennsylvania
  - Rachel Carson Falls, formed by the above stream
- Rachel Carson Trail, a trail in Pennsylvania
- Statue of Rachel Carson, an outdoor sculpture by David Lewis in Woods Hole, Massachusetts, US

== See also ==
- RV Rachel Carson, a list of research vessels named after Carson
- Rachel Carson Homestead, birthplace and childhood home in Pennsylvania of the environmentalist
- Rachel Carson House (Colesville, Maryland), adult home of the environmentalist
- Rachel Carson Prize (environmentalist award)
- Rachel Carson Prize (academic book prize)
