= RV Rachel Carson =

RV Rachel Carson is the name of four research vessels, named after the American marine biologist and conservationist Rachel Carson.

- RV Rachel Carson (1977), a former naval gunboat, acquired by the Environmental Protection Agency in 1977 and later scrapped.
- RV Rachel Carson (2003), a former supply vessel, acquired by the Monterey Bay Aquarium Research Institute in 2011.
- RV Rachel Carson (2008), a Challenger-class research vessel, launched in 2008 and operated by the University of Maryland.
- RV Rachel Carson (2003b), a former fisheries research vessel, launched in 2003 and acquired in 2017 by the University of Washington.
