= Saritha Komatireddy =

American federal prosecutor

- Komatireddy in 2026

Chief of Staff of the Drug Enforcement Administration
- In office 2023–2024

Assistant United States Attorney for the Eastern District of New York
- In office 2013 – October 2025

Personal details
- Born: 1984 or 1985 (age 41–42) New York City, New York, U.S.
- Party: Republican
- Children: 4
- Education: Harvard University (BA, JD)
- Occupation: Attorney, adjunct faculty at Columbia Law School
- Known for: Republican nominee in the 2026 New York Attorney General election
- Website: Campaign website

Saritha Komatireddy (born 1984 or 1985) is an American attorney, former federal prosecutor in New York, and former chief of staff of the Drug Enforcement Administration. She was the Republican nominee for attorney general of New York in the 2026 election. She lost the general election to incumbent Democrat Letitia James.

Komatireddy was born in Brooklyn, New York, to Indian immigrant parents. She graduated from Harvard University and then from Harvard Law School, where she was an editor of the Harvard Law Review. She began her legal career by clerking for Brett Kavanaugh, when he served as a judge on the U.S. Court of Appeals for the D.C. Circuit, before he joined the U.S. Supreme Court. Komatireddy served as counsel to the federal commission investigating the Deepwater Horizon oil spill under the President Barack Obama administration.

She prosecuted international terrorists, drug lords, and others for a 12 years as an Assistant U.S. Attorney for the Eastern District of New York. She also served as chief of staff of the Drug Enforcement Administration during the Biden administration. In 2020, Trump nominated Komatireddy to serve as Judge of the Eastern District of New York, but her nomination lapsed when the term ended. She is a partner in the New York office of the law firm of Holtzman Vogel, and teaches as an adjunct faculty member at Columbia Law School.

== Early life and personal life ==
Komatireddy was born in Coney Island in Brooklyn, New York. Her parents, Hanumanth Reddy, a cardiologist, and Geetha Reddy, a rheumatologist, had immigrated to the U.S. from Telangana, India, and settled there in the 1980s.

She lives on the Upper East Side in Manhattan in New York City, with her husband and four children (two sets of twins).

== Education ==
Komatireddy graduated from Hickman High School in 2001. While there, she was named a United States Presidential Scholar.

She then attended Harvard University ('05), where she earned her Bachelor of Arts in government. While there, she served as an Editor of The Harvard Crimson. Komatireddy was also the producer of the 15th annual production of the Harvard South Asian Association’s cultural show, Ghungroo.

Komatireddy earned her Juris Doctorate, magna cum laude, from Harvard Law School ('09). There, she served as an editor on the Harvard Law Review.

== Legal career ==
=== Federal clerkship (2009–10) ===
Komatireddy began her legal career clerking for Justice Brett Kavanaugh in 2009–10, when he served as a judge on the United States Court of Appeals for the District of Columbia Circuit, before he joined the U.S. Supreme Court. When Kavanaugh was nominated to the U.S. Supreme Court, Komatireddy described him as having had "a fundamental respect for the law and a complete commitment to getting it right".

=== Counsel to federal commission (2010–11) ===
Komatireddy next served from 2010 to 2011 as counsel to the federal commission investigating the Deepwater Horizon oil spill. Appointed under President Barack Obama's administration, she operated as part of the Chief Counsel's Investigative Team for the National Commission on the BP Deepwater Horizon Oil Spill and Offshore Drilling in Washington, D.C.

=== Private practice and law school adjunct faculty (2011–13) ===
She then was an associate from 2011–13 for the law firm of Kellogg, Hansen, Todd, Figel & Frederick. There, she worked on three federal trials. Komatireddy also taught Oil and Gas Law at George Washington University Law School.

=== Assistant U.S. Attorney (2013–25) ===
In 2013, Komatireddy was appointed Assistant United States Attorney for the Eastern District of New York; she left the position in 2025. She served for 12 years, including in the positions of Deputy Chief of General Crimes, Acting Deputy Chief of International Narcotics and Money Laundering, and as the Computer Hacking and Intellectual Property Coordinator under U.S. Presidents Barack Obama, Joe Biden, and Donald Trump. In endorsing her for NY State Attorney General, the Yonkers Times noted that "She served under Presidents Obama, Biden, and Trump."

As an Assistant U.S. Attorney, she was involved in the 2017 trial of al-Qaeda aligned terrorist Muhanad Mahmoud Al Farekh and the 2025 arraignments of Rafael Caro Quintero and Vicente Carrillo Fuentes. Komatireddy also prosecuted cybercrime, money laundering, violent gangs, rapists, and foreign public corruption. She was one of the three lead prosecutors who prosecuted Ercan Findikoglu, a global cybercriminal who the US Department of Justice (DOJ) reported was sentenced to eight years in prison and ordered to pay $55 million for masterminding global bank card data hacking campaigns that inflicted tens of millions of dollars in losses. She was also one of three prosecutors who prosecuted Sergey Ovsyannikov, a ring leader in a global digital advertising fraud infrastructure scheme; the DOJ announced that the prosecution resulted in him pleading guilty and in the forfeiture and transfer of $15 million in illicit proceeds from Swiss bank accounts to the U.S. government. She tried eight federal criminal trials and argued 15 cases in front of the U.S. Court of Appeals for the Second Circuit.

Among the awards that Komatireddy received was a 2017 Younger Federal Lawyer Award recipient from the Federal Bar Association. She also received from Attorney General Merrick B. Garland two Attorney General's Distinguished Service Awards and a John Marshall Award as part of a team of prosecutors from the Eastern District of New York. Additionally, she received two Federal Law Enforcement Foundation Prosecutor of the Year awards with her colleagues, one for convicting a Brooklyn man who provided material support to ISIS that resulted in death. She also received two True American Hero Awards.

=== Federal judge nomination (2020) ===
On May 4, 2020, President Donald Trump nominated Komatireddy to serve as a judge on the U.S. District Court for the Eastern District of New York. The American Bar Association rated her well qualified by a majority and qualified by a minority for the judgeship. However, her nomination lapsed when the term ended. Had she been confirmed, she would have been the first Telugu American judge on a federal bench.

=== Drug Enforcement Administration (2023–24) ===
Komatireddy was detailed to serve as the Chief of Staff of the Drug Enforcement Administration during the Biden administration from 2023 to 2024. Afterward, she returned to her primary position as an Assistant U.S. Attorney. She left the U.S. Attorney's Office entirely in October 2025, to transition into private practice as a law firm partner.

=== Private practice and law school adjunct faculty (2025–present) ===
In November 2025, Komatireddy joined the law firm Holtzman Vogel as a partner in its New York office, where she focuses on federal investigations, commercial litigation, and appellate matters. At the same time, she teaches as an adjunct faculty member at Columbia Law School, a position she first took in 2014.

== 2026 attorney general election ==
Komatireddy was the Republican candidate for attorney general of New York in the 2026 election. She won the Republican nomination with 86% of the vote. She also ran on the Conservative Party ballot line. She was endorsed by President Donald Trump, former New York governor George Pataki, and former New York City police commissioner Ray Kelly, among others.

Komatireddy said that public safety and combating crime should be the top priority of the attorney general's office. She stated that she would protect the rights of citizens to access abortion clinics and safely express their sexual orientation. She expressed her belief that the office was too focused on politics, at the expense of addressing issues affecting everyday New Yorkers. In regards to mental health issues, Komatireddy proposed building an Office of Civil Commitment staffed by a combination of law enforcement and doctors to oversee new residential treatment centers. She also supported reforming New York State bail laws to give judges more discretion over whether a defendant poses a threat to public safety.

Komatireddy faced incumbent Letitia James in the general election on November 3, 2026. The race was called for James on November 4th.

== Writings ==
- Saritha Komatireddy & Christopher P. Costa (September 9, 2026). "New York Hasn’t Faced a Threat Like This Since 9/11," National Review.
- Alicyn Cooley, John Gleeson, David C. James, Saritha Komatireddy, Gordon Mehler (2026). Federal Criminal Practice: A Second Circuit Handbook, LexisNexis.
- Tice, Saritha Komatireddy (March 22, 2008). "A "plausible" explanation of pleading standards: Bell Atlantic Corp. v. Twombly," Harvard Journal of Law & Public Policy
