= R. V. Truitt =

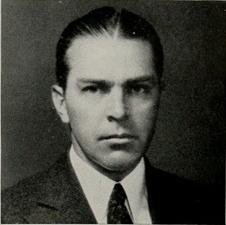
- Truitt as coach in 1928

Biographical details
- Born: August 12, 1890; Snow Hill, Maryland, U.S.
- Died: April 11, 1991 (aged 100); Easton, Maryland, U.S.

Playing career
- 1911–1914: Maryland

Coaching career (HC unless noted)
- 1919–1927: Maryland

Head coaching record
- Overall: 22–8–1

Reginald Van Trump Truitt (August 12, 1890 – April 11, 1991) was an American zoologist, Army officer, and college lacrosse player and coach. He spent his professional career studying the oyster habitat in the Chesapeake Bay. Truitt founded the Chesapeake Biological Laboratory at what is now the University of Maryland Center for Environmental Science. He also served as the first head lacrosse coach at his alma mater, the University of Maryland from 1919 to 1927. Truitt was inducted into the National Lacrosse Hall of Fame in 1959.

== Early life ==
Truitt was born on August 12, 1890, in Snow Hill, Maryland. He attended Snow Hill High School, from which he graduated in 1910. He then went on to college at the Maryland Agricultural College (now the University of Maryland) in 1910. While there, he played lacrosse and competed in track, winning letters in both sports in 1911, 1912, 1913, and 1914. He served as the lacrosse team's captain and student coach as a senior in 1914. Truitt graduated from Maryland that year with a Bachelor of Science degree.

Truitt served in the United States Army Air Service during the First World War. He received a commission as a second lieutenant and served as a pilot in a pursuit squadron.

== Professor and coach at Maryland ==
After the war, Truitt began teaching at the University of Maryland. In 1919, he served as a graduate assistant in zoology. Truitt taught as a zoology professor at Maryland from 1925 to 1941.

Truitt received his PhD from American University in Washington, D.C., in 1929. In 1930, Truitt married Mary Virginia née Harrington, daughter of former Maryland governor Emerson Harrington. The couple had two daughters: Virginia in 1931 and Gertrude (Trudy) in 1938, as well as a son, Emerson, who was born in 1933.

Truitt was Maryland's first official lacrosse coach and served in that capacity from 1919 to 1927. In 1923, Truitt, Curley Byrd, Burton Shipley, and Geary Eppley founded the M Club, an athletic alumni association, as a means to keep former student-athletes actively involved with the university. In 1924, Maryland elevated its team to the varsity level, and Truitt amassed a varsity record of 22–8–1. Truitt continued his post-graduate education at Maryland, where he wrote his master's thesis on the oyster industry. He received his Master of Science degree in 1921.

After his coaching tenure, he remained active in the sport of lacrosse, and in the 1920s and 1930s, Truitt served as an official. He also wrote numerous lacrosse articles that were published in Baltimore newspapers, and was responsible for organizing a tour of the United States by English collegiate teams from the University of Oxford and the University of Cambridge. Truitt held several offices with the United States Intercollegiate Lacrosse Association.

== Founder of the Chesapeake Biological Laboratory ==
Truitt's interests in the ecology of the Chesapeake Bay from an early age. Truitt's father held oyster leases in Maryland's coastal bays, and the young Truitt noted the declines in production from these leases. This motivated his interest in the biology of both crabs and oysters. While working for the US Fisheries Commission, Truitt started thinking about establishing his own base of operations. He evaluated potential sites in Virginia, and on Maryland's Eastern Shore, but finally settled on Solomons, MD home to an active crab processing facility, in part because the people of Solomons gave him a small building from which to base his operations. In 1925, Truitt founded the Chesapeake Biological Laboratory on Solomons Island, as a joint collaboration between the Carnegie Institute in Washington, DC., Gaucher College, and St. Johns College. From its founding, the Chesapeake Biological Laboratory offered summer programs for students, and provided research space for marine biologists. He served as the laboratory's first director, and remained in that post until his retirement in 1954. The Chesapeake Biological Laboratory is the founding laboratory of the University of Maryland Center for Environmental Science

Truit spent three decades studying the habitat of Chesapeake Bay oysters, and the Maryland Department of Natural Resources later called him "the most respected and influential scientist of his era in the Bay region and a tireless advocate for scientific inquiry into the Chesapeake."

During the Second World War, Truitt worked for the government researching underwater sound, for which he received a commendation from the United States Navy. He was a partner in the George W. Truitt & Company oyster business in Snow Hill until 1943.

== Later life and honors ==
In 1954, Truitt retired as the director of the Chesapeake Biological Laboratory and director of the Maryland Department of Natural Resources's Department of Research and Education. He settled at Great Neck Farm in Stevensville, Maryland. Truitt died of pneumonia at the age of 100 on April 11, 1991, at Memorial Hospital in Easton, Maryland.

The National Lacrosse Hall of Fame inducted Truitt as a player in 1959. The University of Maryland Athletic Hall of Fame inducted him in 1984.

For his work in the Chesapeake, Truitt received the Rachel Carson Award from the state of Maryland in 1981. In 1987, The Baltimore Sun's Sunday Sun magazine included him in its "150 People Who Shaped the Way We Live" in its 150th anniversary issue. A research laboratory, built in 1973, on the Chesapeake Biological Laboratory campus was named in his honor. The original building was demolished in 2016 and new laboratory was rededicated to R.V. Truitt in 2017. After his death, the Truitt Memorial Fund was established to award scholarships for study in the marine sciences at the Chesapeake Biological Laboratory.

== Published works ==
- Kent Island: Maryland's Oldest Settlement (1965)
- High Winds, High Tides: A Chronicle of Maryland's Coastal Hurricanes (1968)
- Assateague... The "Place Across": A Saga of Assateague Island (1971)
- Worcester County, Maryland's Arcadia (1977)
