= Deepwater Horizon investigation =

Multiple congressional, federal, and independent inquiries were conducted in the aftermath the catastrophic Deepwater Horizon oil spill, which occurred on April 20, 2010, in the Gulf of Mexico.

The disaster, caused by a blowout on the BP-operated Macondo Prospect, resulted in the largest marine oil spill in history, with significant environmental, economic, and legal consequences. Investigations were launched by various U.S. government agencies, independent commissions, and BP itself to determine the causes of the explosion, assess regulatory failures, and recommend measures to prevent similar incidents in the future.

The investigation included several investigations and commissions, among others reports by National Incident Commander Thad Allen, United States Coast Guard, National Commission on the BP Deepwater Horizon Oil Spill and Offshore Drilling, Bureau of Ocean Energy Management, Regulation and Enforcement, National Academy of Engineering, National Research Council, Government Accountability Office, National Oil Spill Commission, and Chemical Safety and Hazard Investigation Board.

These investigations uncovered a series of safety lapses, regulatory oversights, and corporate decisions that contributed to the disaster, ultimately leading to major legal settlements, regulatory reforms, and stricter offshore drilling policies.

== April 2010 Coast Guard and Mineral Management Services investigation ==
On 22 April 2010, the United States Coast Guard and the Minerals Management Service launched an investigation of the possible causes of the Deepwater Horizon explosion; they obtained and analyzed the blowout preventer, a crucial piece of evidence as to the cause of the explosion and spill.

In a 23 December letter, the U.S. Chemical Safety Board asked the Bureau of Ocean Energy Management, Regulation and Enforcement (formerly called the Minerals Management Service) to discontinue its investigation of the blowout preventer, which began 16 November at a NASA facility near New Orleans, until dealing with conflicts of interest. The board said Transocean and Cameron International, maker of the blowout preventer, had more access than the board did, and that Det Norske Veritas, which led the testing, should be removed or monitored more closely. Transocean said the board's "accusations are totally unfounded."

On 8 December, Joe Keith, a senior Halliburton manager, said to the U.S. Coast Guard-Interior Department panel in Houston that he left his post aboard Transocean's rig to smoke a cigarette on the night of the April disaster in the Gulf. While he was away from his monitors, charts entered into evidence showed that pressure data indicated the well was filling up with explosive natural gas and crude. Halliburton shares immediately fell on the New York Stock Exchange when news of his testimony emerged.

On 23 March 2011, BOEMRE and the Coast Guard published the forensic examination report prepared by U.S. Det Norske Veritas (DNV) Columbus, the contractor that performed the examination. The report concluded that the primary cause of failure was that the blind shear rams failed to fully close and seal due to a portion of drill pipe trapped between the shearing blocks. This happened because the drill pipe elastically buckled within the wellbore due to forces induced on the drill pipe during loss of well control, consequently, drill pipe in process of shearing was deformed outside the shearing blade surfaces, and, consequently, the blind shearing rams were not able to move the entire pipe cross section into the shearing surfaces of the blades. Therefore, oil continued to flow through the drill pipe trapped between the ram block faces and subsequently through the gaps between the ram blocks. Since the pipe buckled when well control was lost, the blind shear rams would have failed to function as planned no matter when they were made active.

In September 2011, BOEMRE and the Coast Guard published its final investigative report on the accident. In essence, that report states that the main cause was the defective cement job, and Halliburton, BP and Transocean were, in different ways, responsible for the accident. The report consists of two volumes. Volume I contains the report of the US Coast Guard. That volume states that, although the events leading to the sinking of Deepwater Horizon were set into motion by the failure to prevent a well blowout, the investigation revealed numerous systems deficiencies, and acts and omissions by Transocean and its Deepwater Horizon crew, that had an adverse impact on the ability to prevent or limit the magnitude of the disaster. These included poor maintenance of electrical equipment that may have ignited the explosion, bypassing of gas alarms and automatic shutdown systems that could prevent an explosion, and lack of training of personnel on when and how to shut down engines and disconnect the MODU from the well to avoid a gas explosion and mitigate the damage from an explosion and fire. These deficiencies indicate that Transocean's failure to have an effective safety management system and instill a culture that emphasizes and ensures safety contributed to this disaster. This investigation also revealed that the oversight and regulation of Deepwater Horizon by its flag state, the Republic of the Marshall Islands (RMI), was ineffective in preventing this casualty. By delegating all of its inspection activities to "recognized organizations," without itself conducting on board oversight surveys, the RMI effectively abdicated its vessel inspection responsibilities.

Volume II of the report cited above contains the report of the Bureau of Ocean Energy Management, Regulation and Enforcement (BOEMRE). That volume states that a central cause of the blowout was failure of a cement barrier in the production casing string, a high‐strength steel pipe set in a well to ensure well integrity and to allow future production. The failure of the cement barrier allowed hydrocarbons to flow up the wellbore, through the riser and onto the rig, resulting in the blowout. The loss of life and the subsequent pollution of the Gulf of Mexico were the result of poor risk management, last‐minute changes to plans, failure to observe and respond to critical indicators, inadequate well control response, and insufficient emergency bridge response training by companies and individuals responsible for drilling at the Macondo well and for the operation of the drilling platform. BP, as the designated operator under BOEMRE regulations, was ultimately responsible for conducting operations at Macondo in a way that ensured the safety and protection of personnel, equipment, natural resources, and the environment. Transocean, the owner of the Deepwater Horizon, was responsible for conducting safe operations and for protecting personnel on board. Halliburton, as a contractor to BP, was responsible for conducting the cement job, and, through its subsidiary (Sperry Sun), had certain responsibilities for monitoring the well.

== May 2010 National Academy of Engineering investigation ==
On 11 May the Obama administration requested the National Academy of Engineering conduct an independent technical investigation to determine the root causes of the disaster so that corrective steps could be taken to address the mechanical failures underlying the accident.

On 16 November, the independent 15-member committee convened by the National Academy of Engineering released a report stating BP and others, including federal regulators, ignored "near misses". University of Michigan engineering practice professor and committee chairman Donald Winter said that sealing the well continued "despite several indications of potential hazard". For example, tests showed the cement was not strong enough to prevent oil and gas from escaping. Also, BP lost drilling materials in the hole. According to Donald Winter, the panel of investigators could not pin the explosion aboard the rig on a single decision made by BP, or anyone else, they found that the companies' focus on speed over safety, given that the well was behind schedule costing BP $1.5 million a day-helped lead to the accident. As Donald Winter told The New York Times, "A large number of decisions were made that were highly questionable and potentially contributed to the blowout of the Macondo well... Virtually all were made in favor of approaches which were shorter in time and lower in cost. That gives us concern that there was not proper consideration of the tradeoffs between cost and schedule and risk and safety." An unused Oil Spill Commission slide obtained by Greenwire, outlines 11 decisions that BP and its contractors ( Halliburton Co., Transocean Ltd. and MI Swaco) made before the disaster that may have increased risk on the rig. At least nine of the decisions saved time, and the majority were made on shore, mainly by BP.

== May 2010 bipartisan National Commission on the BP Deepwater Horizon Oil Spill and Offshore Drilling investigation ==
On 22 May President Obama announced that he had issued Executive Order 13543 establishing the bipartisan National Commission on the BP Deepwater Horizon Oil Spill and Offshore Drilling, with former Florida Governor and Senator Bob Graham and former Environmental Protection Agency Administrator William K. Reilly serving as co-chairs. The purpose of the commission was to "consider the root causes of the disaster and offer options on safety and environmental precautions." Future federal prosecutor and political candidate Saritha Komatireddy served from 2010 to 2011 as counsel to the Commission, operating as part of its Chief Counsel's Investigative Team.

On 8 November, the inquiry by the Oil Spill Commission revealed its findings that BP had not sacrificed safety in attempts to make money, but that some decisions had increased risks on the rig. However, the panel said a day later that there had been "a rush to completion" on the well, criticizing poor management decisions. "There was not a culture of safety on that rig," co-chair Bill Reilly said. One of the decisions met with tough questions was that BP refuted the findings of advanced modelling software that had ascertained over three times as many centralizers were needed on the rig. It also decided not to rerun the software when it stuck with only six centralizers, and ignored or misread warnings from other key tests, the panel said.

On 5 January 2011, the White House oil spill commission released a final report detailing faults by the companies that led to the spill. The panel found that BP, Halliburton, and Transocean had attempted to work more cheaply and thus helped to trigger the explosion and ensuing leakage. The report states: "Whether purposeful or not, many of the decisions that BP, Halliburton, and Transocean made that increased the risk of the Macondo blowout clearly saved those companies significant time (and money)." BP released a statement in response to this, saying, "Even prior to the conclusion of the commission's investigation, BP instituted significant changes designed to further strengthen safety and risk management." Transocean, however, blamed BP for making the decisions before the actual explosion occurred and government officials for permitting those decisions. Halliburton stated that it was acting only upon the orders of BP when it injected the cement into the wall of the well. Halliburton also blamed the governmental officials and BP. It criticized BP for its failure to run a cement bond log test.

In the report, BP was accused of nine faults. One was that it had not used a diagnostic tool to test the strength of the cement. Another was ignoring a pressure test that had failed. Still another was for not plugging the pipe with cement. The study did not, however, place the blame on any one of these events. Rather, it concluded with the following statement blaming the management of Macondo:

Better management of decision-making processes within BP and other companies, better communication within and between BP and its contractors and effective training of key engineering and rig personnel would have prevented the Macondo incident.

The panel also noted that the government regulators did not have sufficient knowledge or authority to notice these cost-cutting decisions. The report advises Changing Business as Usual

The record shows that without effective government oversight, the offshore oil and gas industry will not adequately reduce the risk of accidents, nor prepare effectively to respond in emergencies. However, government oversight, alone, cannot reduce those risks to the full extent possible. Government oversight (see Chapter 9) must be accompanied by the oil and gas industry's internal reinvention: sweeping reforms that accomplish no less than a fundamental transformation of its safety culture. Only through such a demonstrated transformation will industry—in the aftermath of the Deepwater Horizon disaster—truly earn the privilege of access to the nation's energy resources located on federal properties.

== June 2010 Department of Justice investigation ==
On 1 June, U.S. Attorney General Eric Holder announced that he opened an investigation of the oil spill. According to Holder, the Justice Department would be interviewing witnesses as part of a criminal and civil investigation. Besides BP, the investigation could apply to other companies involved in the drilling of the damaged well.

== June 2010 Congressional investigations ==
The United States House Committee on Energy and Commerce conducted a number of hearings.

On 30 April, the House Committee on Energy and Commerce asked Halliburton to brief it as well as provide any documents it might have related to its work on the Macondo well. Attention has focused on the cementing procedure and the blowout preventer, which failed to fully engage. A number of significant problems were identified with the blowout preventer: There was a leak in the hydraulic system that provides power to the shear rams. The underwater control panel had been disconnected from the pipe ram, and instead connected to a test ram. The blowout preventer schematic drawings, provided by Transocean to BP, did not correspond to the structure that was on the ocean bottom. The shear rams were not designed to function on the joints where the drill pipes were screwed together or on tools that were passed through the blowout preventer during well construction. The explosion may have severed the communication line between the rig and the sub-surface blowout preventer control unit such that the blowout preventer would have never received the instruction to engage. Before the backup dead man's switch could engage, communications, power and hydraulic lines must all be severed, but it is possible hydraulic lines were intact after the explosion. Of the two control pods for the deadman switch, the one that was inspected had a dead battery. Employee Tyrone Benton told the BBC on 21 June that a leak was spotted on a crucial piece of equipment in the oil rig's blowout preventer weeks before the accident, and that Transocean and BP were emailed about it.

According to the testimony of Doug Brown, the chief mechanic on the Deepwater Horizon, on 26 May at the joint U.S. Coast Guard and Minerals Management Service hearing, a BP representative overruled Transocean employees and insisted on displacing protective drilling mud with seawater just hours before the explosion. One of the BP representatives on the board responsible for making the final decision, Robert Kaluza, refused to testify on the Fifth Amendment grounds that he might incriminate himself; Donald Vidrine, another BP representative, cited medical reasons for his inability to testify, as did James Mansfield, Transocean's assistant marine engineer on board.

On 17 June, Tony Hayward testified before the Committee. The heads of Anadarko and Mitsui's exploration unit will testify before the Committee 22 July. In a statement made in June the Committee noted that in a number of cases leading up to the explosion, BP appeared to have chosen riskier procedures to save time or money, sometimes against the advice of its staff or contractors.

In an 18 June statement, Jim Hackett, the CEO of Anadarko Petroleum Corporation, said research "indicates BP operated unsafely and failed to monitor and react to several critical warning signs during the drilling. ... BP's behavior and actions likely represent gross negligence or willful misconduct." BP responded by strongly disagreeing with the Anadarko statement and said that, despite being contractually liable for sharing clean-up costs, Anadarko is "refusing to accept responsibility for oil spill removal costs and damages". BP has sent Anadarko a bill for $272.2 million; Anadarko is "assessing our contractual remedies".

According to the US Congressional investigation, the rig's blowout preventer, a fail-safe device fitted at the base of the well, built by Cameron International Corporation, had a hydraulic leak and a failed battery, and therefore failed. On 19 August, Admiral Thad Allen ordered BP to keep the blowout preventer to be used as evidence in any court actions.

On 25 August, Harry Thierens, BP's vice president for drilling and completions, told the hearing that he found that the blowout preventer was connected to a test pipe, rather than the one conveying oil to the surface. He said that he was "frankly astonished that this could have happened."

== August–September 2010 BP reports ==
In late August, BP released findings from its own internal probe, which it began immediately after the spill began. BP found that on 20 April managers misread pressure data and gave their approval for rig workers to replace drilling fluid in the well with seawater, which was not heavy enough to prevent gas that had been leaking into the well from firing up the pipe to the rig, causing the explosion. The investigation also questioned why an engineer with BP, the team leader overseeing the project, ignored warnings about weaknesses in cement outside the well which could have prevented the gas from escaping. The conclusion was that BP was partly to blame, as was Transocean, which owned the Deepwater Horizon oil rig.

On 8 September, BP released a 193-page report on its web site. The report identified 8 key findings with respect to the cause of the accident. 1) The day before the accident, cement had been poured to fill the gap between the borehole (the actual hole in the ground) and the casing (the outermost pipe), and this cement failed and oil moved into that space from the reservoir. 2) Oil then entered the production casing (an inner pipe) although two barriers (one made of cement called a "shoe track") were supposed to prevent this. 3) A test was conducted as to whether the well was sealed (a negative pressure test), conducted by temporarily replacing heavy drilling mud with lighter seawater. This is controlled unbalancing of the well. The test was considered successful, although it was not, since oil was actually moving out of the reservoir. The report names the Transocean rig crew and the BP staff on hand as having made this error. 4) When the test was completed, the seawater was replaced with mud, which was brown stopping the flow. But later, when preparing to temporarily shut down the well, mud was again replaced with seawater, allowing oil to flow up the riser toward the rig. This flow was detected by pressure sensors on the rig. The report blames the rig crew for missing the increased pressure readings. 5) When the flow was noticed, the crew activated the blowout preventer and diverted the oil to a mud separation system rather than diverting it into the ocean; diverting it into the ocean may have spared much of the damage. 6) The design of the mud separation system allowed the oil to keep coming and gas carried by the oil to be vented onto the rig. 7) The venting system allowed the gas to move into areas of the rig where it would be in contact with electrical equipment. 8) The blowout preventer failed in several ways; controls on the rig were disabled by the explosion; an automatic shutoff system within the blowout preventer failed, probably due to failure of two components - a solenoid and battery; when a submersible was able to activate a blind shear within the blowout preventer, the blind shear functioned but failed to seal the well. Transocean, responding to the report, blamed "BP's fatally flawed well design."

== June 2014 US Chemical Safety Board investigation ==
Deepwater Horizon Blowout (2014) Official USCSB investigatory information film reel.

The U.S. Chemical Safety Board (CSB) highlighted flaws in both equipment and industry safety procedures, contributing to the oil spill in its report.

The CSB concluded that a primary contributor to the spill was a malfunctioning blowout preventer (BOP). The investigation discovered that the BOP malfunctioned due to miswired control systems, which would have otherwise allowed it to seal the ruptured well. Moreover, the board identified discrepancies in pressures inside the drillpipe and the space between the pipe and the well, leading the drillpipe to shift off-center. This displacement meant that a crucial component within the BOP, known as the shear ram, was unable to cut through the pipe and seal the well. The CSB emphasized that these findings reveal both recognized and overlooked limitations in BOP design.

Post the disaster, regulations necessitated operators to conduct hazard analyses for all offshore structures. However, the CSB pointed out that these regulations don't demand a specified risk reduction target or a recorded reasoning for hazard control. This loophole allows companies to potentially carry out superficial analyses, which may not accurately assess the operational status of critical safety equipment, like the BOP. As a result, a company could technically comply with the rule without genuinely ensuring maximum safety precautions.

Geoff Morrell, a spokesperson for BP, acknowledged that the core findings of the CSB mirrored the conclusions of other investigations. Several other probes, such as those led by the U.S. Coast Guard and a commission designated by President Barack Obama, ascertained that the catastrophe resulted from various causes and involved multiple entities. However, the CSB did not investigate all facets of the Macondo blowout but instead concentrated on equipment, hazardous materials operations, and safety management.
