= Carys Mitchelmore =

American ecotoxicologist

Academic background
- Education: BSc, Biology, 1992, University of Portsmouth; M.Sc, Aquatic Toxicology, 1993 University of Portsmouth; Ph.D., 1997, University of Birmingham
- Thesis: Genetic Toxicity in Aquatic Organisms (1997)

Carys Mitchelmore is an ecotoxicologist who also served as Director of the Chesapeake Biological Laboratory (2023-2025).

Mitchelmore is a British-born, American marine ecotoxicologist who was named the Director of the Chesapeake Biological Laboratory Chesapeake Biological Laboratory of the University of Maryland Center for Environmental Science in 2023. She lives in the nearby Calvert County, Maryland town of Lusby, Maryland.

== Education ==
Mitchelmore received a B.Sc in 1992 from the University of Portsmouth in the United Kingdom in Biology, a M.Sc in 1993 in Aquatic Toxicology from the University of Portsmouth, and a Ph.D. in Biochemistry and Genetic Toxicology from the University of Birmingham in 1997 with a dissertation entitled Genetic Toxicity in Aquatic Organisms.

== Career ==
Since joining the faculty of the Chesapeake Biological Laboratory in 2002, she has played a high profile role in providing advice to policy makers through testimony to the US Senate and the Maryland State Legislature on important topics such as the potential hazards associated with the use of dispersants in oil spill cleanups and contamination of persistent pesticides in surface waters. She has also served on the local Calvert County Environmental Commission.

More recently, she has contributed to understanding the practical environmental effects of UV filters in sunscreens through participation in a US National Academies of Sciences, Engineering, and Medicine workshop and published report, as well as contributing peer-reviewed studies of coral reef exposure to chemicals in consumer sunscreens and serving as the first author of a widely cited review of the available literature.
