= J. Sook Chung =

South Korean carcinologist

- 정점숙
- Born: Jum Sook Chung
- Education: Pusan National University; Seoul National University; Texas A&M University
- Scientific career
- Fields: Carcinology, neuroendocrinology
- Workplaces: Birkbeck, University of London; University of Wales; University of Maryland Institute for Bioscience and Biotechnology Research; University of Maryland Center for Environmental Science
- Doctoral advisor: Cho Wan-kyoo

Jum Sook Chung (Korean: 정점숙) is a South Korean carcinologist who researches the impact of neuroendocrine regulation on crustacean physiology, sex differentiation, and stress responses. She is a professor at the University of Maryland Center for Environmental Science Institute of Marine and Environmental Technology.

== Education ==
Jum Sook Chung completed a B.S. from Pusan National University in 1979. In 1981, she earned a M.S. in the department of zoology at Seoul National University. Her academic supervisor was Cho Wan-kyoo. Chung earned a Ph.D. in the department of entomology at Texas A&M University in 1991 under academic advisor Larry L. Keeley.

== Career ==
Chung was a research associate in the department of biology at Birkbeck, University of London from 1991 to 1994. She was a research scientist in the school of biological sciences at University of Wales from 1994 to 2003. Chung was an assistant professor in the center of marine biotechnology at the University of Maryland Institute for Bioscience and Biotechnology Research from 2004 to 2010. In 2010, she joined the faculty at University of Maryland Center for Environmental Science Institute of Marine and Environmental Technology. She was promoted to associate professor in 2012. Chung is a professor.

=== Research ===
Chung researches the impact of neuroendocrine regulation on crustacean physiology, sex differentiation, and stress responses. Her laboratory sequenced and mapped the full genome of a Callinectes sapidus.
