= Chesapeake Biological Laboratory =

Marine science laboratory in Maryland

Coordinates: 38°19′7″N 76°27′15″W

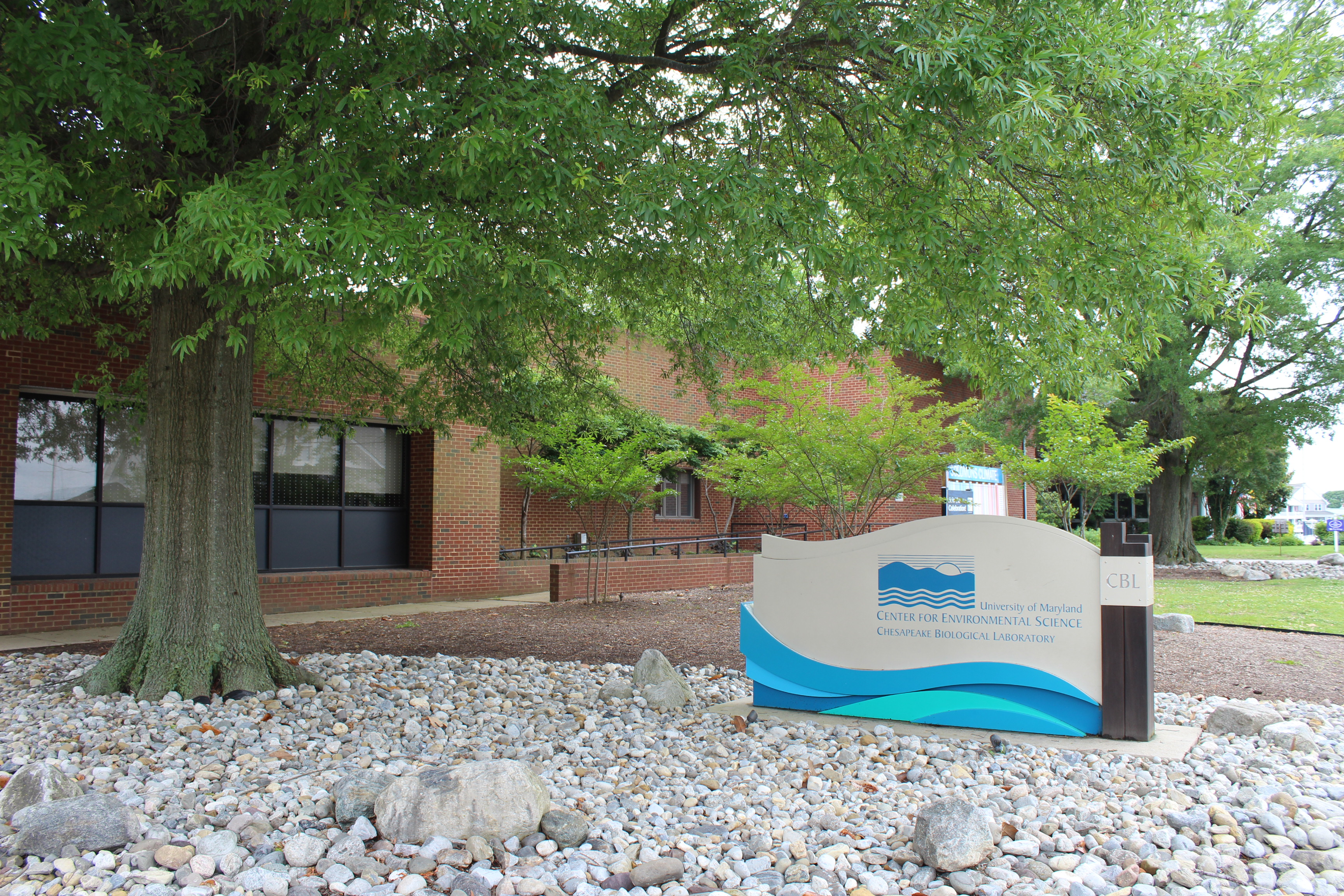
- Type: Marine biology institute
- Headquarters: Solomons, Maryland
- Website: Chesapeake Biological Laboratory

The Chesapeake Biological Laboratory (CBL) is a marine science laboratory on the Chesapeake Bay in Solomons, Maryland, and it is the oldest state-supported marine laboratory on the East Coast of the U.S. It was founded in 1925 in a small waterman's shack by Dr. Reginald V. Truitt and is part of the University of Maryland Center for Environmental Science.

As of 2013, CBL had 28 faculty members, 7 visiting PhD-level scientists, 22 students, 29 research technicians and 33 staff.; total employment by 2021 was 128, and the lab was the 20th largest employer in Calvert County The CBL campus includes 21 buildings, which include purpose built research facilities with running sea water and environmentally-controlled chambers. The Nutrient Analytical Services Laboratory is a key service lab that provides chemical analysis for samples from across the United States. The lab has other diverse instrumentation that allow its scientists to make measurements of biogeochemical constituents. One example is a stable isotope mass spectrometer, located in the Bernie Fowler Laboratory, which is named for a local politician, Bernie Fowler, who advocated for cleaning up Chesapeake Bay. Local research is supported by the research vessel RV Rachel Carson (2008), which is home ported at CBL.

== Directors ==
- Reginald Truitt (1925–1954)
- Eugene Cronin (1955–1976)
- Joe Cooney (1976–1984)
- Kenneth Tenore (1984–2005)
- Margaret Palmer (2005–2011)
- Thomas Miller (2011–2023)
- Carys Mitchelmore (2023–2025)
- Beth Polidoro (2025–)

== Notable faculty ==
- Jacqueline M. Grebmeier
- Carys Mitchelmore
- Margaret A. Palmer
- Robert Ulanowicz
