= RV David Packard =

American oceanographic research vessel

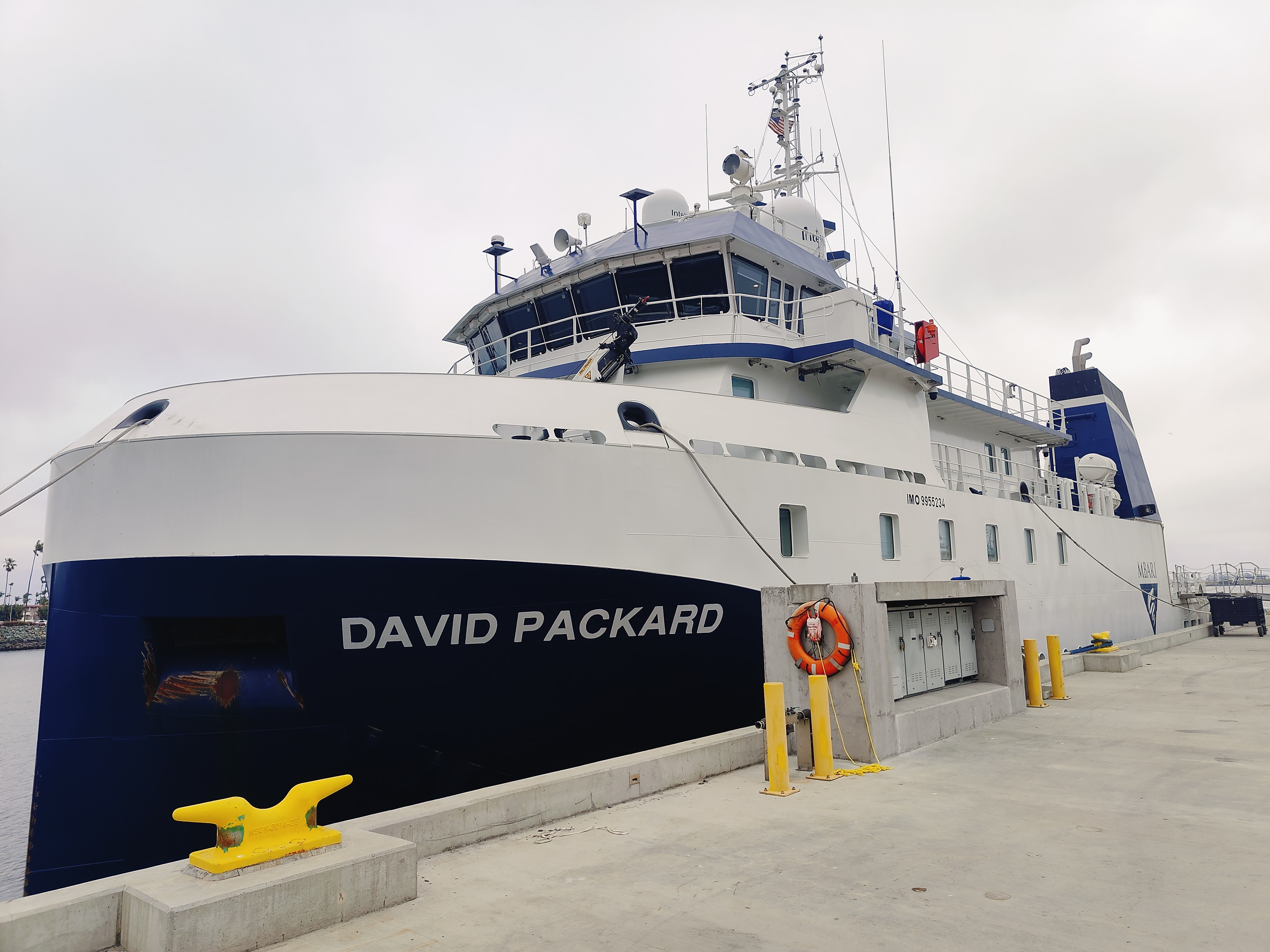
- RV David Packard docked at San Diego in March 2025.

History

United States
- Name: David Packard
- Namesake: David Packard, MBARI founder
- Owner: MBARI
- Launched: 2024
- Acquired: 2025
- Home port: Moss Landing, California
- Status: Active

General characteristics
- Type: Research vessel
- Length: 50 m (164 ft 1 in)
- Beam: 12.8 m (42 ft 0 in)
- Draft: 3.65 m (12 ft 0 in)
- Installed power: 3 × 629 ekW MAN D2862 LE427 generators
- Propulsion: 2 × Schottel SRP260 propellers; 2 × 530 kW RAMME magnet motors; 1 × 300 kW ZF Marine 300 RT side thruster
- Speed: Max 11.5 knots (21.3 km/h; 13.2 mph)
- Range: 4,000 nmi (7,400 km; 4,600 mi)
- Capacity: 18 scientists
- Crew: 12

RV David Packard is a scientific research vessel operated by the Monterey Bay Aquarium Research Institute (MBARI). The ship is named after engineer and philanthropist David Packard, who founded MBARI in 1987.

== Construction ==
MBARI began looking at the acquisition of a new research vessel in 2009, with the intention to fully replace the aging RV Western Flyer in 2023. MBARI chose Seattle-based Glosten in 2010 to design the ship and assisted in the shipyard bidding process, awarding Vigo company Freire to construct the vessel. The construction contract with Freire was finalized in 2021. Special care needed to taken into account, as Western Flyer regularly deployed the remotely operated underwater vehicle (ROV) Doc Ricketts and would need the vessel to serve as a command center for deepwater research. The ship was designed to be larger than the previous research vessel to expand MBARI's ability to collaborate with external partners, increase endurance for a larger operational range, and launch autonomous technologies.

The keel for the David Packard was laid in November 2021. The hull was completed and floated for the first time at the Vigo estuary in October 2022. At this point the ship was able to test the retractable stabilizer and dynamic positioning systems. Following the test, the ship returned to shipyard to work on the ship's internal science and engineering systems. MBARI retained a close relationship with Sonardyne deep positioning systems and chose the company's Ranger 2 USBL system to support geodesy and AUV survey missions. MBARI had also used Sonardyne technologies on previous research vessels, the RVs Point Lobos and Western Flyer.

Despite problems related to the COVID-19 pandemic and supply chain issues bloating the ship's construction time by over a year, construction remained on budget.

David Packard was completed and departed from Vigo on February 1, 2025 for a 59-day transit to Moss Landing. En route the ship stopped in Ensenada, where scientists and students from the Autonomous University of Baja California and Ensenada Center for Scientific Research and Higher Education were hosted aboard the ship. The vessel was delivered to MBARI on March 31, 2025 and was estimated to cost US$50,000,000. Upon arrival, MBARI began work on installing custom oceanographic equipment prior to additional time in dry dock and regulatory inspections. The ship's first scientific missions are expected in late 2025.

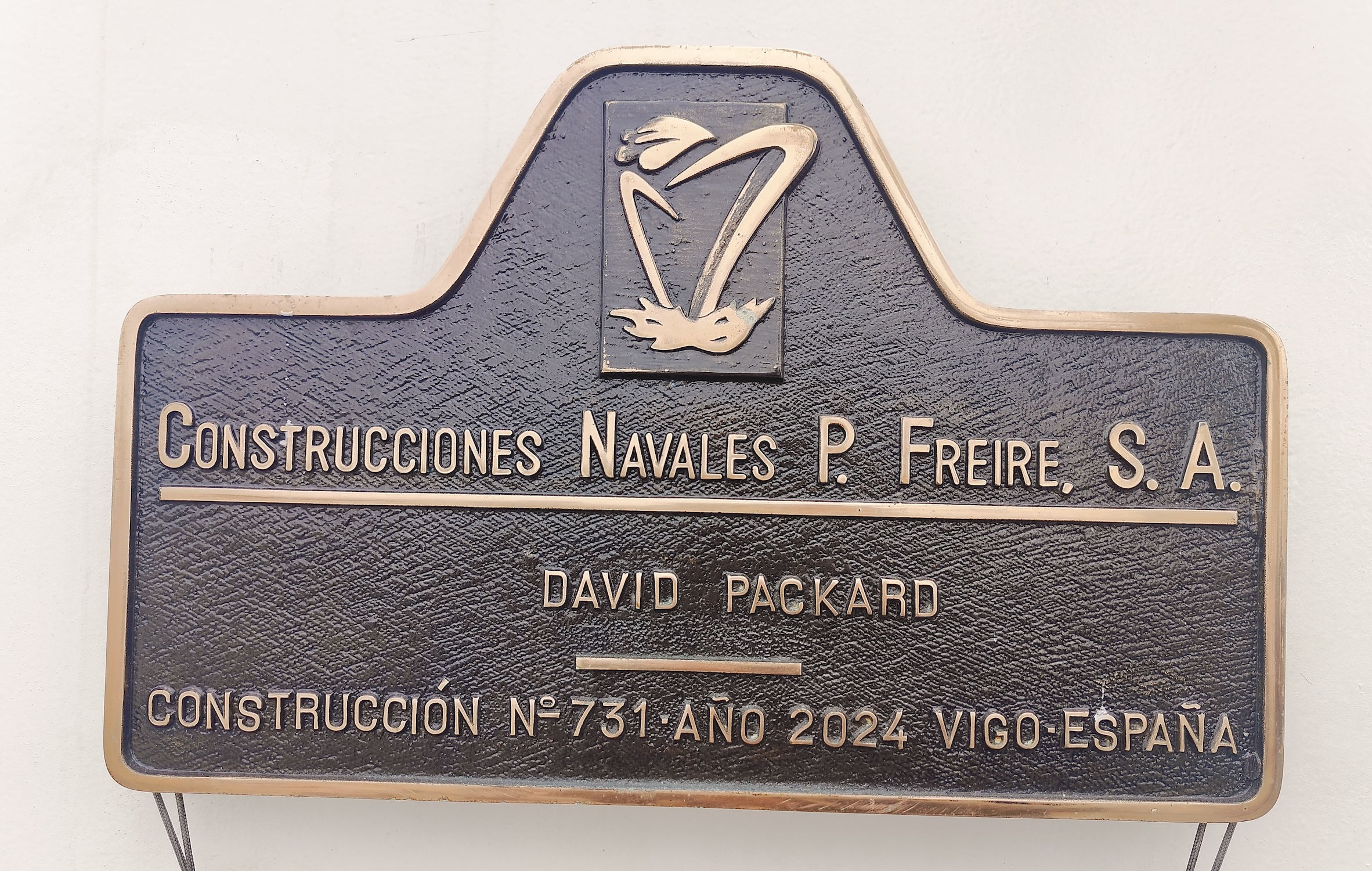
Construction plaque aboard David Packard
