= Jacqueline M. Grebmeier =

American ecologist

Jacqueline Mary Grebmeier

Academic background
- Education: BSc, Zoology, 1977, University of California, Davis; MA, biology, Stanford University; MA, Marine Affairs, University of Washington; Ph.D., 1987, University of Alaska Fairbanks
- Thesis: The ecology of benthic carbon cycling in the northern Bering and Chukchi Seas (1987)

Jacqueline M. Grebmeier is an American ecologist who specializes in polar biological oceanography.

== Early life and education ==
Grebmeier completed her Bachelor of Science degree in Zoology from the University of California, Davis in 1977 before enrolling at Stanford University for her first Master's degree in Biology. Following this, she earned her second master's degree in Marine Affairs from the University of Washington in 1983, specializing in applications of Arctic science to Arctic resource utilization policy, and her PhD in Biological Oceanography from the University of Alaska Fairbanks in 1987.

== Career ==
Upon completing her PhD, Grebmeier joined the faculty at the University of Tennessee in 1989. As a research associate professor of ecology and evolutionary biology, she was the project co-leader on a joint U.S.-Russian study of ecosystems in the Bering and Chukchi seas and an advisor to the National Academy of Sciences and the National Science Foundation. In 2000, Grebmeier was selected by President Bill Clinton to serve on the Arctic Research Commission in order to develop and recommend an integrated national policy on research in the Arctic. Following this, she served as part of a team studying the relationship between plankton in the ocean surrounding Antarctica and carbon dioxide in the atmosphere. In 2006, Grebmeier and her colleagues published the seminal paper, "A major ecosystem shift in the northern Bering Sea" in Science, which showed the harms of global warming in the ecology of the Bering Sea.

Grebmeier was appointed a research professor at the University of Maryland Center for Environmental Science, working in the Chesapeake Biological Laboratory, in 2008. While serving in this role, she chaired the International Pacific Arctic Group to establish a Distributed Biological Observatory in the North American Arctic. As a result of her "exceptional and sustained contributions to the understanding of the Arctic" Grebmeier was awarded the 2015 IASC Medal and the Alaska Ocean Leadership Award from the Alaska SeaLife Center. The following year, she won the 2016 President's Award for Excellence in Application of Science for her "exceptional and sustained contributions to the understanding of the Arctic."

In 2018, Grebmeier was elected a fellow of the American Association for the Advancement of Science. During the COVID-19 pandemic, Grebmeier raised the alarm on the rising disappearing Alaskan sea ice and its significant impact on the Arctic marine ecosystem.

== Personal life ==
Grebmeier is married to Lee Cooper, an oceanographer, and they have one daughter together.
