= Ed Eagan =

American football player (born 1993)

No. 85, 9, 16, 84, 13
- Positions: Wide receiver, return specialist

Personal information
- Born: June 19, 1993 (age 33); New Orleans, Louisiana, U.S.
- Listed height: 5 ft 10 in (1.78 m)
- Listed weight: 198 lb (90 kg)

Career information
- High school: Holy Cross (New Orleans)
- College: Northwestern State
- NFL draft: 2016: undrafted

Career history
- Dallas Cowboys (2016)*; Cleveland Browns (2016)*; Buffalo Bills (2016); New York Giants (2017); DC Defenders (2020)*
- * Offseason or practice squad member only

Awards and highlights
- 2× First-team All-SLC (2014, 2015); FCS All-American (2014); College Sporting News FCS Special Teams Player of the Year (2014); All-Louisiana (2015)

Career NFL statistics
- Games played: 4
- Stats at Pro Football Reference

Ed Eagan (born June 19, 1993) is an American former professional football player who was a wide receiver in the National Football League (NFL) for the Buffalo Bills and New York Giants. He played college football for the Northwestern State Demons.

== Early life ==
Eagan attended Holy Cross High School. As a sophomore, he made 5 interceptions and returned 2 punts for touchdowns.

Ed ran a 4.39 40 yard dash.

As a junior, he collected 8 interceptions and had one punt return for a touchdown, while contributing to the team finishing with a 10-3 record. He set a state record with 5 interceptions in a single-game. He received All-district, All-metro and All-state honors.

As a senior, he tallied 3 interceptions, while returning two punts, one kickoff and one fumble recovery for touchdowns. He received All-district, All-metro and All-state honors.

He also practiced basketball and track. He was the long jump regional champion and finished third in the state as a junior.

== College career ==
Eagan accepted a football scholarship from Northwestern State University. As a true freshman, he played sporadically at cornerback and returner. He had 14 tackles, one forced fumble, 12 kickoff returns for 282 yards and 8 punt returns for 83 yards. He scored his first touchdown on an 82-yard kick return against Sam Houston State University. He had 98 all-purpose yards as a returner against the University of Central Arkansas.

As a sophomore, he was switched to wide receiver, but maintained his return duties, becoming the team's second-leading receiver and its top returner in 9 games. He registered 46 receptions (led the team), 585 receiving yards (second on the team), 3 receiving touchdowns, 13 punt returns (led the team), 124 punt return yards (led the team), 34 kickoff returns (led the team) and 798 kickoff return yards (led the team). Set school records for kickoff returns and kickoff return yards in a single-season. He had 7 receptions for 145 yards and a touchdown against Southeastern Louisiana University.

As a junior in 2014, he totaled 73 receptions for 908 yards, 6 receiving touchdowns and averaged 180.8 all-purpose yards per game (second in the FCS). He broke five school records and tied another, including career kickoff return yardage (2,125), single-season kickoff return yardage (1,045), single-season kickoff returns (45), single-season receptions (73), single-game receiving yardage (238 yards vs. McNeese State University), and tied the single-game receptions mark (13 vs. Abilene Christian University).

As a senior, even though the team didn't settle on starting quarterback Stephen Rivers until midseason, he recorded 58 receptions for 745 yards, 4 receiving touchdowns and averaged 145.5 all-purpose yards per game (15th in the FCS), establishing a school career All-purpose yard record (5,651).

Eagan finished his college career with 177 receptions and 2,228 receiving yards, both Northwestern records. He had 13 receiving touchdowns, as well as over 2,900 kick return yards and 4 return touchdowns.

=== Collegiate statistics ===
Season	Team	Class	Pos	GP	Receiving				Rushing			
Season	Team	Class	Pos	GP	Rec	Yds	Avg	TD	Att	Yds	Avg	TD
2012	NSU Demons	FR	WR	9	0	0	0.0	0	0	0	0.0	0
2013	NSU Demons	SO	WR	12	44	576	13.1	3	3	20	6.7	0
2014	NSU Demons	JR	WR	12	73	908	12.4	6	1	7	7.0	0
2015	NSU Demons	SR	WR	11	58	745	12.8	4	8	38	4.8	0
Career				44	175	2,229	12.7	13	12	65	5.4	0

== Professional career ==
Pre-draft measurables
Height	Weight	Arm length	Hand span	Wingspan	40-yard dash	10-yard split	20-yard split	20-yard shuttle	Three-cone drill	Vertical jump	Broad jump	Bench press
5 ft 10 1/4 in (1.78 m)	192 lb (87 kg)	28 7/8 in (0.73 m)	9 3/8 in (0.24 m)	5 ft 10 5/8 in (1.79 m)	4.51 s	1.54 s	2.62 s	4.13 s	7.09 s	34.0 in (0.86 m)	9 ft 10 in (3.00 m)	6 reps
All values from Pro Day

=== Dallas Cowboys ===
Eagan was signed as an undrafted free agent by the Dallas Cowboys after the 2016 NFL draft on May 6. He was released by the Cowboys on August 10, 2016.

=== Cleveland Browns ===
On August 14, 2016, Eagan was signed by the Cleveland Browns. He was released by the Browns on August 29.

=== Buffalo Bills ===
On September 27, 2016, Eagan was signed to the Buffalo Bills' practice squad. He was promoted to the active roster on October 25, 2016, but was released three days later. He was re-signed to the practice squad on October 31, 2016.

=== New York Giants ===
On August 18, 2017, Eagan signed with the New York Giants. He was waived by the Giants on September 2, and was re-signed to the practice squad on September 20. Eagan was promoted to the active roster on October 10. He appeared in four games, registering four punt returns for 20 yards. Eagan was waived by the Giants on November 14.

=== DC Defenders ===
Eagan signed with the DC Defenders of the XFL on January 8, 2020. He was waived by the Defenders during final roster cuts on January 22.
