= Cherry A. Murray =

American professor

Cherry Ann Murray
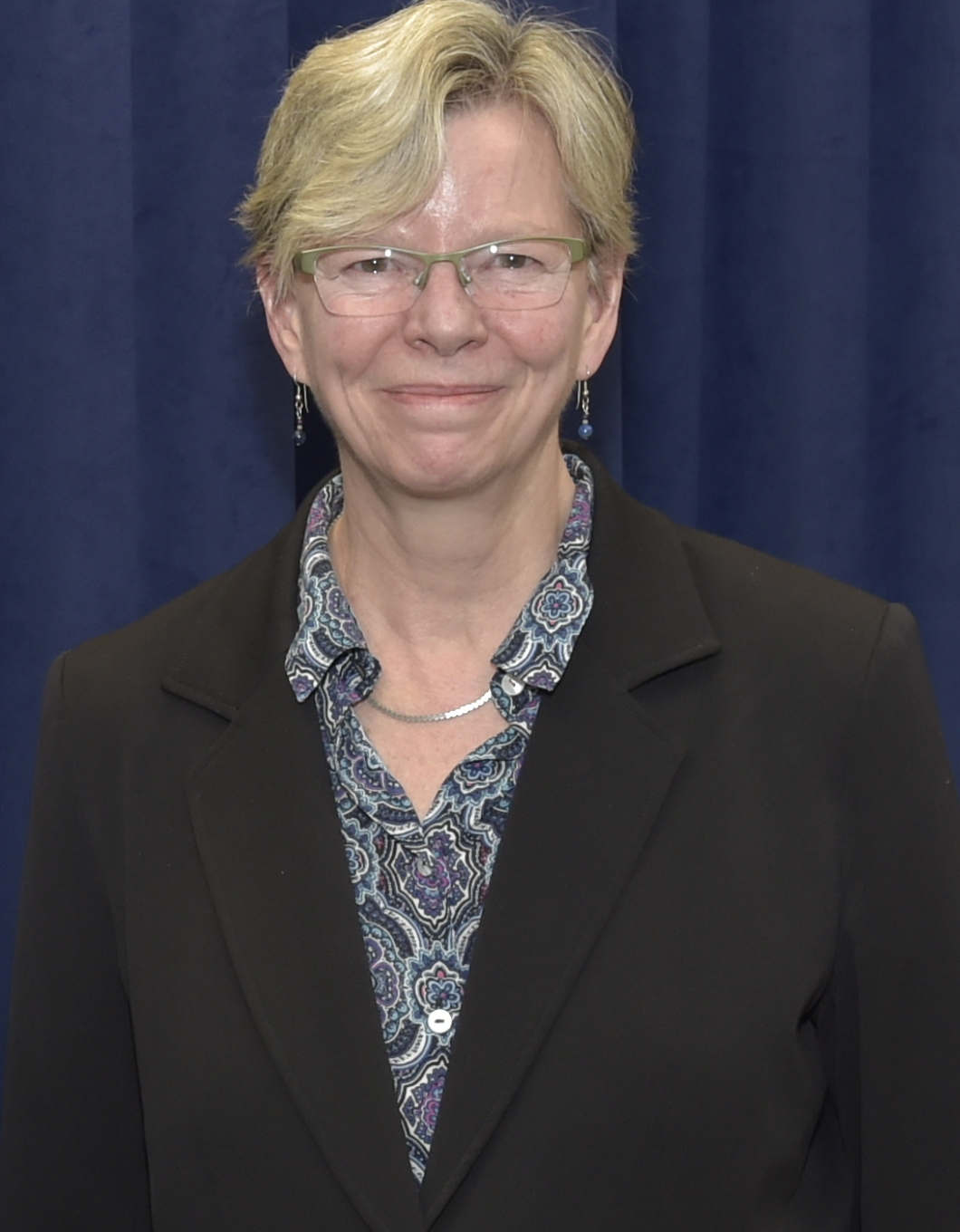
- Born: Fort Riley, Kansas
- Education: S.B. (Physics) (MIT, 1973), Ph.D. (Physics) (MIT, 1978)
- Awards: American Physical Society Maria Goeppert-Mayer Award (1989), American Physical Society George E. Pake Prize (2005), National Medal of Technology and Innovation (2012)
- Scientific career
- Fields: Physics, Applied physics, Experimental physics
- Workplaces: Massachusetts Institute of Technology, Lawrence Livermore National Laboratory, Bell Laboratories, Harvard School of Engineering and Applied Sciences, United States Department of Energy

Cherry Ann Murray is an American academic who is professor of physics and the director of the Biosphere2 Institute at the University of Arizona at Tucson. She is the Benjamin Peirce Professor of Technology and Public Policy emerita at, and former dean of, the Harvard School of Engineering and Applied Sciences (SEAS).

She was the 2009 president of the American Physical Society (APS) and chair of the Division of Engineering and Physical Science of the National Research Council. In October 2014, she announced via an email to the Harvard community that she would be stepping down from her post at the end of the year, with an interim dean to be named by FAS Dean Michael Smith and a permanent dean following a formal search.

== Biography ==
=== Early life and education ===
Born in Fort Riley, Kansas, and the daughter of a diplomat, Murray lived in the United States, Japan, Pakistan, South Korea, and Indonesia as a child. Murray completed her undergraduate science degree in physics in 1973 at the Massachusetts Institute of Technology, from where she was awarded her Ph.D. in physics in 1978. She then conducted postgraduate and post-doctoral research on ultrahigh-vacuum and surface physics, studying the surface phonons of porous vycor glass with Professor Thomas J. Greytak from 1974 to 1978. During this time, she was awarded with an IBM Graduate Fellowship from 1975 to 1977.

=== Career ===
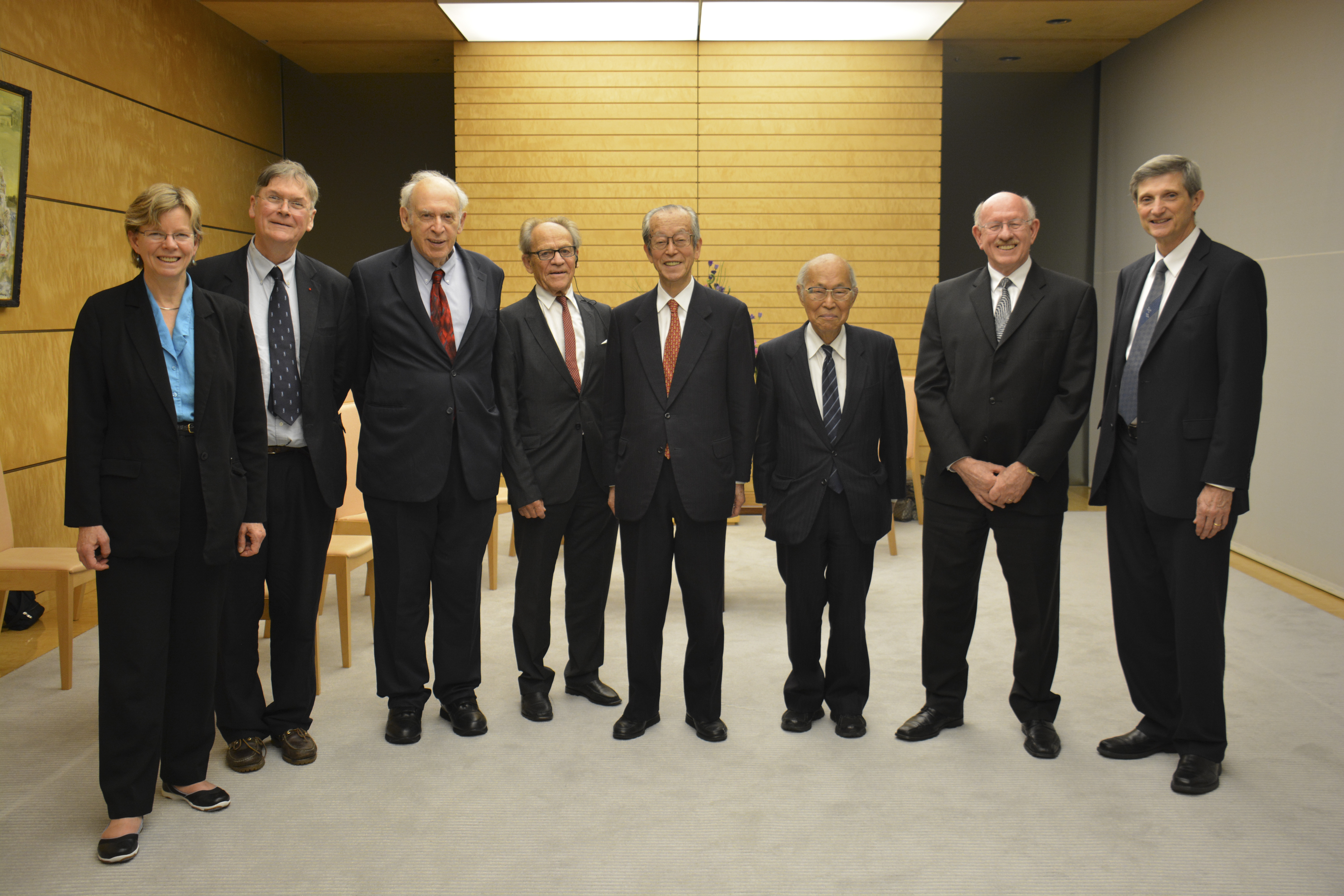
with Tim Hunt, Jerome Isaac Friedman, Torsten Wiesel, Kōji Omi, Akito Arima, Jonathan M. Dorfan and Robert Baughman

Murray has published more than 70 papers in peer-reviewed journals and holds two patents in near-field optical data storage and optical display technology. Her current primary research focus includes the use of light scattering, soft condensed matter, and complex fluids. Prior to her appointment at SEAS on July 1, 2009, Murray was Principal Associate Director for Science and Technology at Lawrence Livermore National Laboratory and previously has held numerous research and leadership positions at Bell Laboratories (the last as senior vice president for physical sciences and wireless research).

A celebrated experimentalist, Murray is well known for her scientific accomplishments using light scattering, an experimental technique where photons are fired at a target of interest. Scientists can then gather insights into surface physics and photonic behavior by analyzing the spray of photons in various directions from such collisions. She is also a leader in the study of soft condensed matter and complex fluids, hybrid materials that show properties of different phases of matter. The control of suspensions, foams, and emulsions has application for the development of everything from novel drug delivery systems to "lab-on-a-chip" devices.

Murray has served on more than 80 national and international scientific advisory committees, governing boards, and National Research Council (NRC) panels. Murray has also been elected to the National Academy of Sciences, the American Academy of Arts and Sciences and the National Academy of Engineering. She is also a Fellow of the American Association for the Advancement of Science and the California Council on Science and Technology. In 2002, Discover magazine recognized Murray as one of the 50 most important women in science. Furthermore, in 1989, Murray won the APS’s Maria Goeppert-Mayer Award for outstanding achievement by a woman physicist in the early years of her career, and in 2005, she was awarded APS’s George E. Pake Prize in recognition of outstanding work combining original research accomplishments with leadership and development in industry.

On June 14, 2010, Murray was appointed by Barack Obama to the National Commission on the BP Deepwater Horizon Oil Spill and Offshore Drilling in the wake of the Deepwater Horizon oil spill.

Murray was a keynote speaker at the 2015 Congress of Future Science and Technology Leaders.

On December 18, 2015, Murray was sworn in as the director of the Office of Science at the Department of Energy. She served until January 13, 2017.
