= Holy Cross School (New Orleans) =

Roman Catholic school in Louisiana, U.S.

Holy Cross High School
- Holy Cross
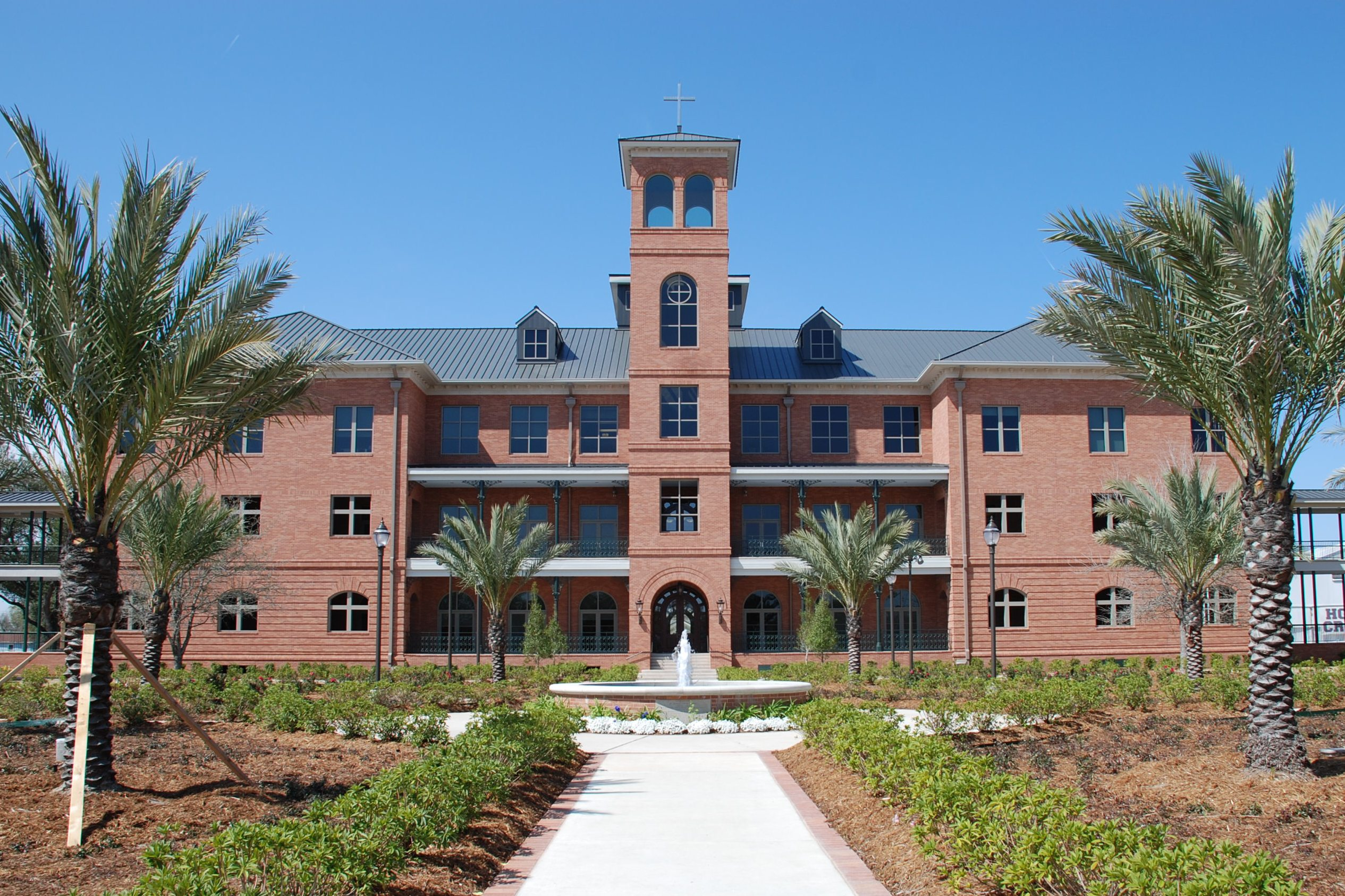

Location
- 5500 Paris Ave; New Orleans, Louisiana 70122; United States; 30°0′50.17″N 90°4′32.39″W

Information
- Type: Private, all-male
- Motto: Crux Spes Unica; The Cross Is Our Only Hope
- Religious affiliations: Roman Catholic, Holy Cross
- Patron saint: Saint Joseph
- Established: 1849
- Founder: Fr. Basil Moreau, CSC
- Principal: Brad Humphreys
- President: Justin Fleetwood
- Chaplain: Very Reverend Patrick J. Williams
- Grades: K-12
- Gender: Male
- Language: English
- Hours in school day: 7.15
- Campus size: 18 acres (73,000 m^{2})
- Campus type: Middle and high school
- Colors: Navy and old gold
- Athletics: LHSAA
- Mascot: Thunder the Tiger
- Nickname: Tigers
- Rival: Jesuit Blue Jays; Chalmette Owls
- Accreditation: Southern Association of Colleges and Schools
- Newspaper: The Bulletin
- Tuition: $10,150 + $2,225 fees = $12,375 total (2023-24, high school)
- Revenue: 6,400,000
- Affiliation: Roman Catholic
- Dean of Men: Mister Kirkwood (8-12); Ronnie Kornick (5-7)
- Dean of Student Life: Dr. Kelly Clark
- Admissions Director: Hannah Hess
- Athletic Director: Mark Faliveno, BS, PETE
- I.T. Director: Jerry Arnone, PMP, MCSE
- Website: www.hcnola.org

Holy Cross School is a Catholic all-boys school serving grades pre-K through 12 in New Orleans, Louisiana, United States. It was founded in 1849 by the Congregation of Holy Cross. Holy Cross School was originally named St. Isidore's College and was a boarding and day school. Holy Cross School is located in the Archdiocese of New Orleans.

== History ==
In 1849 the Brothers, Priests, and Sisters of Holy Cross arrived in New Orleans after they had established the University of Notre Dame in South Bend, Indiana, and took over an orphanage for the boys and girls who survived a plague. The orphanage, along with the first Ursuline School for Girls (the oldest Catholic School in America), was destroyed to make room for the 1923 Industrial Canal, which experienced levee failures that flooded large parts of New Orleans twice, with Hurricane Betsy in 1965 and Hurricane Katrina in 2005.

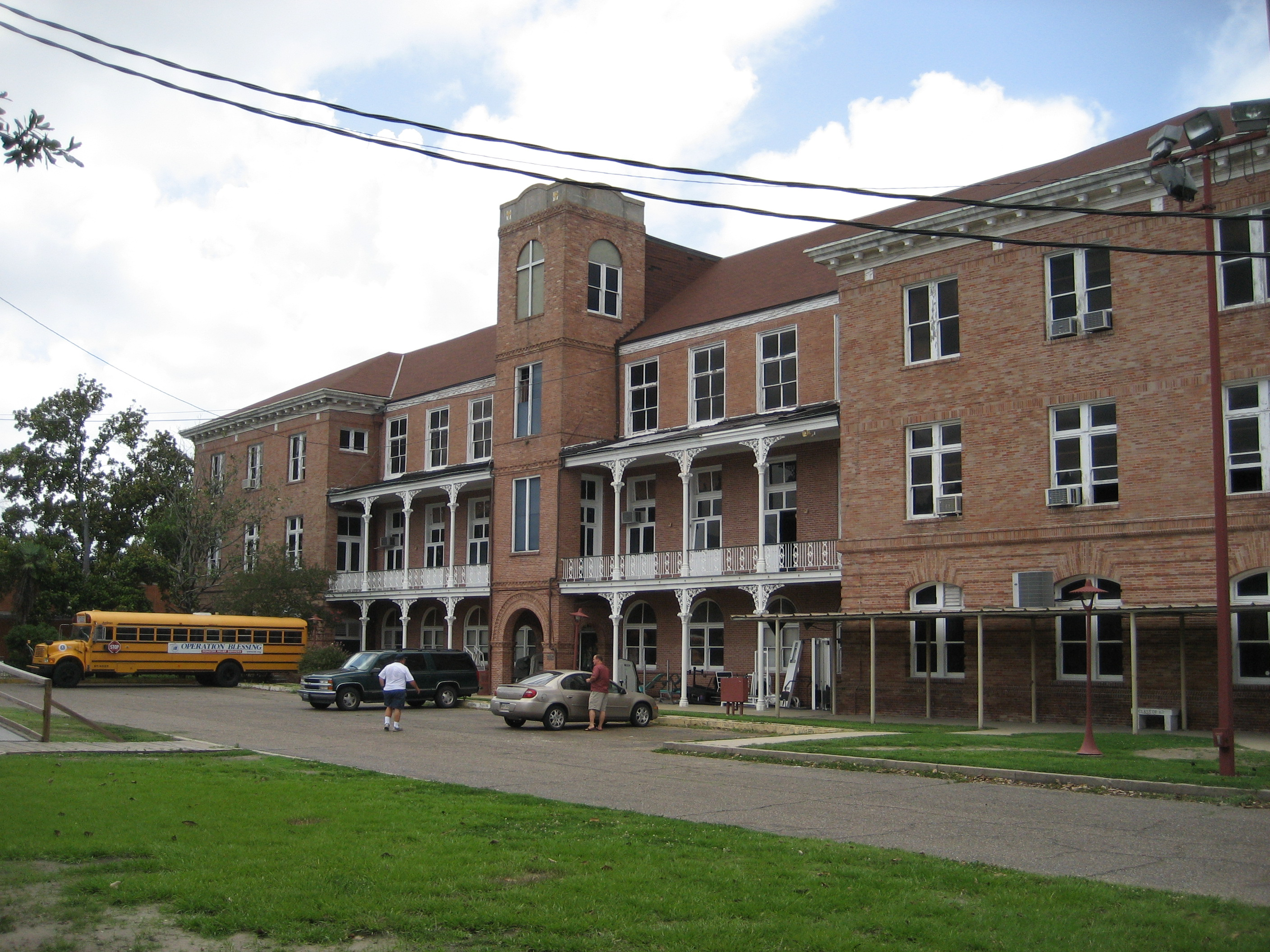
Historic Holy Cross campus in the Lower 9th Ward

In 1871, Holy Cross moved to its historic site, which then was a farm named St. Isidore's farm, on 4950 Dauphine Street, and built a renowned "collegiate-styled campus" and established in 1879 its current school, bordered by the high Mississippi River levee. The area has since become a Federal Historic District known as the Holy Cross Historic District.

First chartered by the State of Louisiana in 1890, the name was changed to Holy Cross in 1895 when the Administration Building was dedicated. A boarding program, which continued until 1973, attracted as many as 150 students annually from across the South as well as from Central and South America.

Prior to 2015 Holy Cross had grades 5–12. The archdiocese began requiring schools to fit one of three grade configurations (PK–7, 8–12, or PK–12) in order to continue affiliation, and Holy Cross needed to change its grade configuration. The school administration decided for the school to become PK–12.

== Holy Cross relocation ==
In August 2005, the flood waters from Hurricane Katrina caused levees to fail on the Industrial Canal. In addition, levees along the Mississippi River-Gulf Outlet Canal were over-topped by storm surge and added to the flooding. The school and the surrounding area was largely ruined and destroyed. Holy Cross relocated to the Gentilly/Seventh Ward neighborhood of New Orleans at 5500 Paris Avenue, the campuses of the former St. Frances Cabrini Parish and Redeemer-Seton High School. The new location of Holy Cross High School includes a high school, middle school, preschool, elementary school, athletic facilities, and an administration building.

The Advisory Committee of the Laura Bush Foundation for America's Libraries chose Holy Cross to receive a $50,000 grant to purchase books for the school's library. First Lady Laura Bush visited Holy Cross on Thursday, April 19, 2007, to present the 14 grantees in Mississippi and Louisiana—including Holy Cross—with the donation.

The former campus in the Lower Ninth Ward sat abandoned for nearly two decades before undergoing a three-year restoration to reopen as an apartment complex in 2025, courtesy of Holy Cross Class of 2004 alumni Zach Smith, who served as the sites project consultant.

== Athletics ==
Holy Cross currently competes in Class 5A of the Louisiana High School Athletic Association.

Holy Cross School fields teams and competitors in many sports. The school currently offers soccer, karate, football, basketball, tennis, baseball, bowling, golf, swimming, wrestling, power lifting, track and field, and cross country.

Athletics history
Holy Cross was the first school in the New Orleans area to field a football team post-Katrina in late September of the 2005 football season.

=== Championships ===
Basketball championships

- (1) State Championships: 1939

Football championships

- (2) State Championships: 1945, 1963

Swimming championships

- (9) State Championships: 2009, 2010, 2018, 2019, 2020, 2021, 2022, 2023, 2024

Championship history
The Tigers were the 1939 state basketball champions. They again made the championship game in 1974 but lost to Brother Martin.

Holy Cross has won the Louisiana State Wrestling Championship 29 times. They have also had a total of 207 individual state champions, which is the most individual state champions in the nation, and 192 state runner-up finishes. 22 of those titles were won between 1945 and 1968; 1951 and 1966 were the only years in this period when the Tigers did not win the state championship. The latest championship was won in 2026.

=== Rivals ===
Holy Cross football vs. Jesuit football is one of the oldest continuous high school rivalries in Louisiana. The first game was played in 1922, which Jesuit won 52–0. The two teams have played every year since, including twice in 1963 (once in regular season and once for the state crown, the latter of which Holy Cross won).

The Tigers have also had a long rivalry with Chalmette High School, owing to Holy Cross' former location in the Lower Ninth Ward and its large student population from neighboring St. Bernard Parish. Chalmette and Holy Cross were rivals in the New Orleans Catholic League from 1968 through 1988.

== Primary school ==
In March 2014, Holy Cross School announced that they will open a primary school and become a Pre-K through 12 school. Holy Cross is the only all-boys Catholic school in the Greater New Orleans area to offer a comprehensive Pre-K through 12th grade education. Holy Cross Primary School opened to all grades (Pre-K through 4) in the fall of 2015.

== Notable alumni ==
- Joe Aillet – Hall of Fame football coach at Louisiana Tech
- Roland Barbay – former NFL tackle
- Donald Boesch – biologist/environmental scientist
- Tony Bouie – former NFL safety
- Sam Butera – saxophonist
- Leroy Chollet – former NBA player
- Gregory G. Colomb – professor of English at the University of Virginia
- Ed Eagan – former NFL wide receiver
- Peter Fos – president of the University of New Orleans (2012–2016)
- Ray Garofalo – Louisiana state representative from St. Bernard Parish
- Joe Heap – Academic All-American, University of Notre Dame, former NFL running back
- Ray Hester – former NFL linebacker
- Billy Kennedy – basketball head coach at Texas A&M
- Anthony Laciura – actor and opera singer
- John Larroquette – film, stage, and Emmy Award-winning television actor (Fr, Soph)
- Hank Lauricella – college football legend, former NFL player, real estate mogul, and member of both houses of Louisiana State Legislature from Jefferson Parish from 1964 to 1996
- Santiago Rodriguez – Van Cliburn silver medalist, concert pianist
- Barryn Sorrell – NFL edge rusher for the Green Bay Packers
- Chris Thompson – former NFL and CFL cornerback
- Billy Truax – former NFL tight end
- Dalton Truax – former NFL offensive tackle
- Len Yochim – former MLB player for the Pittsburgh Pirates
- Ray Yochim – former MLB player for the St. Louis Cardinals

== Resources ==
- Homecoming Isn't a Game This Season by Jere Longman
- In Tale of Church vs. School, a New Orleans Dilemma
- Our Founder
