= Donald Boesch =

American academic

Donald F. Boesch

President of the University of Maryland Center for Environmental Science
- In office 1990–2017

Personal details
- Born: November 14, 1945 (age 80) New Orleans, Louisiana
- Education: Tulane University (B.S.); College of William & Mary (Ph.D.)
- Profession: Biologist, Environmental Scientist
- Website: Professor

Donald F. Boesch (born November 14, 1945) is a professor of marine science and, from 1990 to 2017, president of the University of Maryland Center for Environmental Science. From 2006-2017, he concurrently served as Vice Chancellor for Environmental Sustainability for the University System of Maryland. In 2010, he was appointed by President Barack Obama as a member of the National Commission on the BP Deepwater Horizon Oil Spill and Offshore Drilling to investigate the root causes of the blowout at the Macondo Prospect in the Gulf of Mexico.

Boesch was born in New Orleans, Louisiana, where he grew up in the 9th Ward and experienced the flooding resulting from Hurricane Betsy. He attended Holy Cross High School and Tulane University, in that city, earning a B.S. in Biology. Boesch completed his Ph.D. in biological oceanography at the College of William of Mary in Virginia, after which he was a Fulbright-Hays Postdoctoral Fellow at the University of Queensland in Australia.

Boesch returned to the United States in 1972 and served as a professor at the Virginia Institute of Marine Science. In 1990 he moved back to his home state as the first Executive Director of the Louisiana Universities Marine Consortium, where he was responsible for building its marine center at Cocodrie, Louisiana, and two research vessels, the Pelican and the Acadiana. During this time, he was also a professor of marine science at the Louisiana State University, Baton Rouge.

Boesch has conducted research on coastal and continental shelf ecosystems along the Atlantic Coast, the Gulf of Mexico, eastern Australia and the East China Sea. He has published two books and nearly 100 papers on marine benthos, estuarine and continental shelf ecology, wetlands, effects of offshore oil and gas development, nutrient over-enrichment, environmental assessment and science policy. While in Louisiana, he initiated the research that documented the Gulf of Mexico Dead Zone and identified its principal causes.

While president of the University of Maryland Center for Environmental Science, he was a member of the Governor’s Chesapeake Bay Cabinet and the Maryland Commission on Climate Change. In 2015, he was recognized as an “Admiral of the Chesapeake". He has been involved in conducting or facilitating research on the Chesapeake Bay for over 35 years, and he has been an official advisor to federal agencies, the Chesapeake Bay Program, and five Maryland governors.

Boesch has served on numerous committees, advising federal agencies and the National Academies of Sciences, Engineering, and Medicine, where he was chair of the Ocean Studies Board and a member of the Committee on America’s Climate Choices and the Advisory Board for the Gulf Research Program. He is currently on the Leadership Council of the Joint Ocean Commission Initiative and the Advisory Board for BONUS: Science for a Better Future of the Baltic Sea Region. In 2007, he was given the Award for Lifetime Leadership in Ecosystem Restoration by the National Conference on Ecosystem Restoration. He is a member of the governing boards of the Chesapeake Bay Foundation, the Town Creek Foundation, and COMPASS, an organization promoting effective science communication.
