= RV Rachel Carson (2003) =

History

United States
- Name: R/V Rachel Carson
- Namesake: Rachel Carson
- Launched: 2003
- Identification: IMO number: 8983210; Call sign: WDF9370; MMSI number: 338415000
- Status: Active

General characteristics
- Type: Oceanographic Research Vessel
- Tonnage: 430 GT
- Length: 135 ft (41 m)
- Beam: 34 ft (10 m)
- Draft: 9 ft (2.7 m)
- Installed power: 2 × 150 kW (200 hp) Northern Lights generators
- Propulsion: 2 × 787 hp (587 kW) Caterpillar 3412 diesel engines; 1 × 384 hp (286 kW) Caterpillar 3126 bow thruster
- Speed: 10 knots (19 km/h; 12 mph)
- Range: 15,000 nmi (28,000 km; 17,000 mi) at 10 kn (19 km/h; 12 mph)

R/V Rachel Carson is a research vessel owned and operated by the Monterey Bay Aquarium Research Institute (MBARI), named in honor of the marine biologist and writer, Rachel Carson.

== Ship history ==
The ship was built in 2003 as an offshore supply and towing vessel, and was first operated by Lytal Enterprises Inc. as the Lytal Team. After Lytal was acquired by Odyssea Marine Inc. In January 2006 she was renamed Odyssea Team.

The ship was acquired by MBARI in mid-2011 to replace the research vessels Zephyr and Point Lobos, and outfitted to operate ROVs and AUVs, and to conduct CTD sampling.
