= Environmental Sample Processor =

The Monterey Bay Aquarium Research Institute's (MBARI's) Environmental Sample Processor (ESP) is a "lab in a can" designed for autonomous deployment. The ESP—provides on-site (in situ) collection and analysis of water samples from the subsurface ocean. The instrument is an electromechanical/fluidic system designed to collect discrete water samples, concentrate microorganisms or particles, and automate application of molecular probes which identify microorganisms and their gene products. The ESP also archives samples so that further analyses may be done after the instrument is recovered.

== HAB-related toxin detection with an Environmental Sample Processor ==
The MBARI-designed Environmental Sample Processor was the first underwater robotic instrument to provide autonomous detection of both a HAB species and its toxin. This ability allows scientists, in near real-time, to determine whether or not an algal bloom is toxic, thus allowing better prediction and treatment of public or ecosystem health threats.

=== The NOAA Great Lakes Environmental Research Laboratory ===
The NOAA Great Lakes Environmental Research Laboratory (GLERL) will deploy the first ever freshwater ESP in Lake Erie. This ESP will measure concentrations of particulate microcystins in the western basin of the lake, every other day. It can also genetically detect Microcystis and archive samples for future processing. With the addition of information from the ESPs, NOAA's suite of Lake Erie HAB products, (i.e. weekly Lake Erie HAB bulletin), and the Experimental HAB Tracker]), will have the ability to provide water managers with bloom location, projected direction, intensity, AND toxicity before the water reaches the intake.

==== Deployments ====
Initial deployments of the ESP took place in 2016: the first field tests of the communications and the microcystin detection happened in July. The ESP was re-deployed in August near the Toledo water intake crib for its first full mission. The Lake Erie ESP is deployed on a custom-built, underwater stationary mooring assembly. It samples the surface and in the water column, allowing the detection of microcystins as they relate to recreational risk (surface concentrations) or drinking water intake risk (at depth concentrations). After QC/QA, data is uploaded to NOAA’s Great Lakes Environmental Research Laboratory (GLERL) "HABs and Hypoxia" page to inform decision making by water managers and other stakeholders in near real-time.

==== Advantages over other monitoring methods ====
Managers without access to ESP data rely on 'in house' toxin testing, weekly sampling, surrogates (i.e. using algal pigment concentrations to infer risk of microcystins), or a combination of those. Toxins detected 'in house' are already either just outside the intake or present in the system. The ESP can provide managers earlier warning of blooms and toxicity. Correlations between data collected on toxicity and chlorophyll concentrations will be monitored in an effort to develop an experimental forecast of bloom toxicity.

==== Development and Funding ====
The Lake Erie ESP was purchased by GLERL with funding from the EPA's Great Lakes Restoration Initiative. NOAA's National Centers for Coastal Ocean Science (NCCOS)] leads development of algal toxin sensors for ESPs. The technology to detect microcystins by ELISA assay) was developed by NCCOS, GLERL, and the Cooperative Institute for Limnology and Ecosystems Research. The viability of ESP technology to assist in monitoring and forecasting of marine HABs and their related toxins in California and the Gulf of Maine has been supported by NCCOS funding.
