= National Commission on the BP Deepwater Horizon Oil Spill and Offshore Drilling =

The National Commission on the BP Deepwater Horizon Oil Spill and Offshore Drilling is a bipartisan presidential commission, established by Executive Order 13543 signed by Barack Obama on May 21, 2010, that is "tasked with providing recommendations on how the United States can prevent and mitigate the impact of any future spills that result from offshore drilling." It came about as a result of the April 2010 Deepwater Horizon oil spill. The first public hearings, held on July 12 and 13, 2010 in New Orleans, included scheduled testimony from Federal government officials and representatives of BP on the status of the spill and clean-up efforts, as well as from local officials, community leaders, and scientists on the economic, cultural and ecological impacts of the oil spill on Gulf Coast communities and ecosystems.

On October 6, 2010, the commission released preliminary reports criticizing the Obama administration for mismanagement of its response to the Deepwater Horizon oil spill. Amongst other things cited were, not being fully candid with the American people, and giving the impression of not being fully competent. On January 11, 2011, the commission released its final report, with recommendations to Congress for new spending and regulations.

== Members ==
- Bob Graham, former Governor of Florida and U.S. Senator (co-chair)
- William K. Reilly, former Administrator of the Environmental Protection Agency (co-chair)
- Frances G. Beinecke, President of Natural Resources Defense Council
- Donald Boesch, President of University of Maryland Center for Environmental Science
- Terry D. Garcia, Executive Vice President for Mission Programs for the National Geographic Society
- Cherry A. Murray, Dean of the Harvard School of Engineering and Applied Sciences and John A. and Elizabeth S. Armstrong Professor of Engineering and Applied Sciences
- Frances Ulmer, Chancellor of the University of Alaska Anchorage and former Lieutenant Governor of Alaska
