= RV Zephyr =

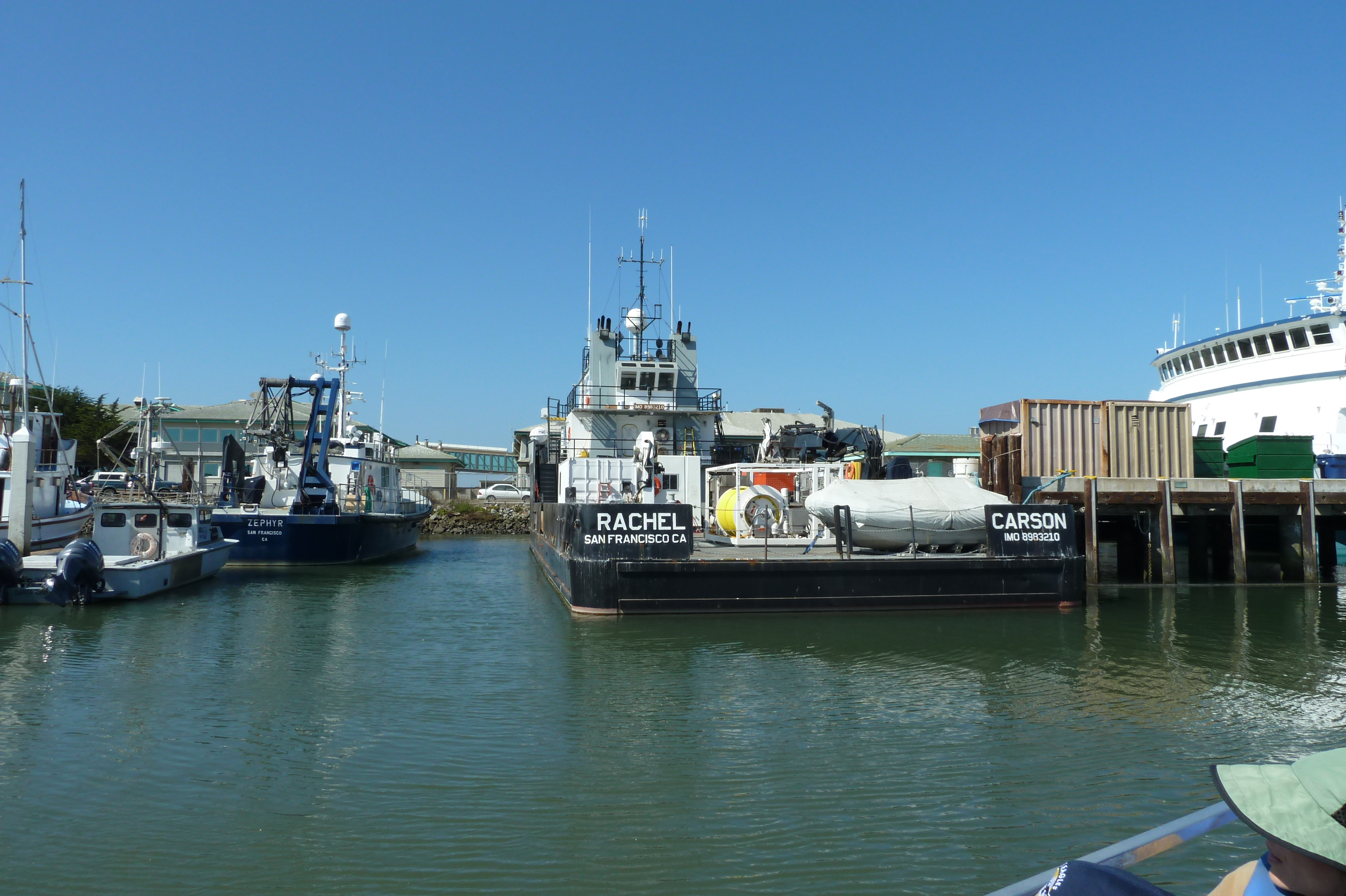
- RV Zephyr at the Monterey Bay Aquarium Research Institute

History

United States
- Name: San Francisco (-2001); RV Zephyr (2001-2013); "Zephyr" (2013-present)
- Owner: San Francisco Bar Pilots Association (-2001); Monterey Bay Aquarium Research Institute (2001-2013); Ron Micjan (2013-Present)
- Operator: Outbound Marine LLC
- Builder: Colberg boat works
- Laid down: 1972
- Launched: 1973
- Identification: IMO number: 8992845; MMSI number: 338142000; Callsign: WDG9976
- Status: Active as of 2024

General characteristics
- Class & type: Research vessel
- Tonnage: 119 GRT
- Length: 79 ft (24 m)
- Beam: 23 ft 6 in (7.16 m)
- Draught: 8 ft (2.4 m)
- Installed power: 840 shp
- Speed: 10 kn (12 mph)
- Range: 2,500 nmi (2,900 mi) at 10 kn (12 mph)

The research vessel Zephyr is currently owned by Ron Micjan and is operated under Outbound Marine LLC. The Zephyr was purchased from Monterey Bay Aquarium Research Institute in October 2013, moved to Portland, Oregon, and refurbished over the next 2.5 years into a custom cruising, small ship expedition and research vessel.

Currently the Zephyr is operational on the Pacific coast of the US and has worked from Juneau and Dutch Harbor Alaska all the way down to San Diego. Customers include NOAA Fisheries, NOAA MML, US Army Corps of Engineers, DARPA, US Navy, US Army and Oregon State University.

Prior ownership of Zephyr was as a research vessel operated by the Monterey Bay Aquarium Research Institute (MBARI). It was the primary platform of operations for MBARI's AUV program and it was then christened R/V Zephyr.

The original owner of the vessel was the San Francisco Bar Pilots Association who had her built to specification by the Colberg Boat Works in Stockton.
