= Monterey Bay Aquarium Research Institute =

American oceanographic research institute

Coordinates: 36.80221°N 121.78803°W

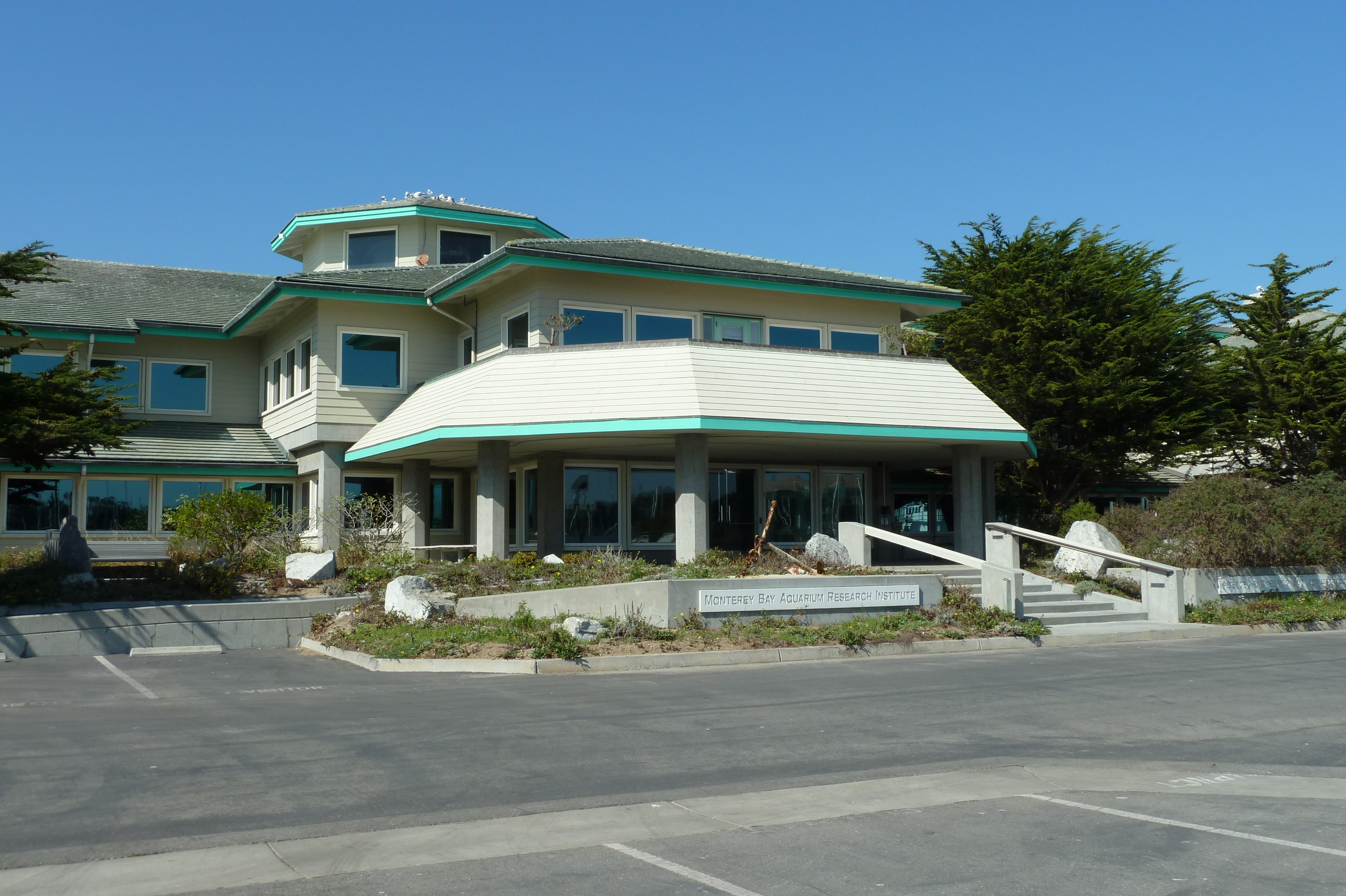
- Established: 1987; 39 years ago
- Research type: Nonprofit
- Field of research: Oceanography
- Director: Julie Packard (Executive director)
- Location: Moss Landing, California, United States
- Affiliations: Monterey Bay Aquarium
- Website: www.mbari.org

The Monterey Bay Aquarium Research Institute (MBARI) is a private, nonprofit, oceanographic research center in Moss Landing, California. It was founded in 1987 by David Packard and is primarily funded by the David and Lucile Packard Foundation. Christopher Scholin serves as the institute's president and chief executive officer, managing a work force of about 220 scientists, engineers, and operations and administrative staff.

At MBARI, scientists and engineers work together to develop new tools and methods for studying the ocean. Long-term funding from the David and Lucile Packard Foundation allows the institute to take on studies that traditional granting institutions may be reluctant to sponsor. Part of David Packard's charge for MBARI was to "Take risks. Ask big questions. Don't be afraid to make mistakes; if you don't make mistakes, you're not reaching far enough."

MBARI's campus in Moss Landing is located near the center of Monterey Bay, at the head of the Monterey Canyon. Monterey Bay is one of many biologically diverse bodies of waters in the world, and the underlying submarine canyon is one of the deepest underwater canyons along the continental United States. With this 4,000-meter-deep submarine canyon only a few ship-hours away from their base of operations, institute scientists possess a proximity to this natural, deep-sea environment for research.

MBARI is not open to the general public, but it has an open house once a year. Although it is a sister institution to the Monterey Bay Aquarium, the two organizations have entirely separate management and funding.

MBARI's service mark depicts a gulper eel.

== History ==
Biological oceanographer Bruce Robison was diving in the HOV Deep Rover off the coast of central California and was frustrated at underwater video technology of the team. He teamed up with Derek Baylis, an engineer at the newly established Monterey Bay Aquarium, to develop an underwater housing for photography and videography. The implementation of this new technology inspired David Packard to think about ocean research programs with a broader objective.

In fall of 1986, Packard assembled a meeting of other West Coast oceanographic institutions (University of Washington, Stanford University, and Scripps Institution of Oceanography) to discuss the possibility of establishing a research institution in Moss Landing, serving the Monterey Canyon. The group decided that the institute would operate independently of the aquarium and fill a niche in ocean technology. The first MBARI board of directors met on June 27th, 1987, led by Packard and chemical oceanographer John Martin.

"Take risks. Ask big questions. Don't be afraid to make mistakes; if you don't make mistakes, you're not reaching far enough."

— David Packard

== Research ==
MBARI's current efforts span the interdisciplinary fields of ocean science, including marine biology, geology, chemistry, and biological oceanography. It also develops new oceanographic research tools and techniques, as well as technology related to ocean observatories.

Much of MBARI's research focuses on the development and use of robotic vehicles and other automated methods for gathering information in the ocean. These tools provide a unique view of ocean life and physical phenomena.

== Research vessels ==
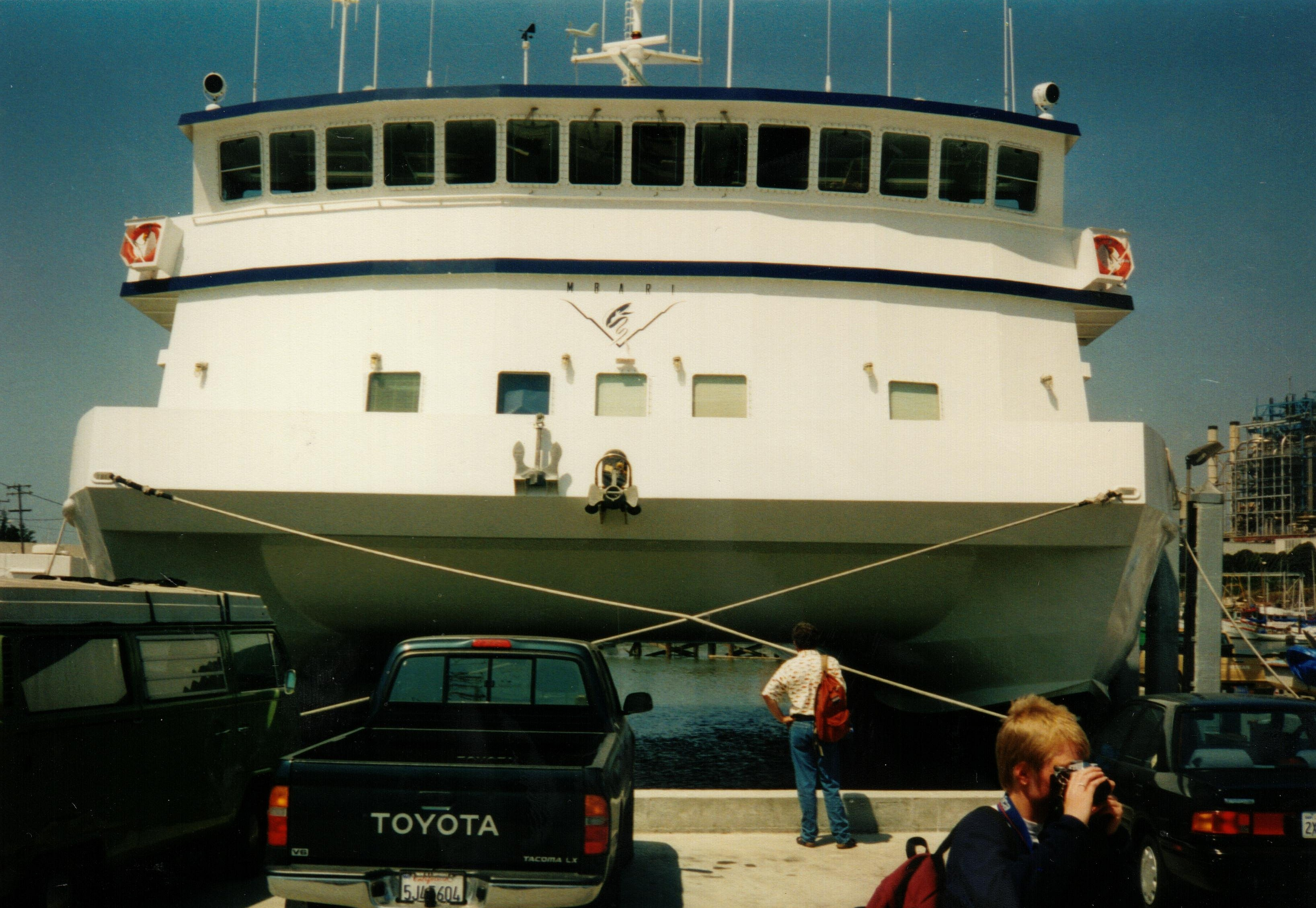
Research vessel Western Flyer at MBARI Pier

In December 2011, MBARI retired the RV Point Lobos after 23 years of service. In 2012, MBARI also retired the RV Zephyr, which served as a launch platform for its autonomous underwater vehicles (AUVs). These two boats were replaced by a single, larger ship, the Rachel Carson, which MBARI purchased in the summer of 2011. The Rachel Carson is able to launch both remotely operated underwater vehicles (ROVs) and AUVs, as well as conduct multiple-day expeditions.

MBARI's flagship research vessel from 1996 to 2022 was the RV Western Flyer, a 35.6-meter (117-foot) small-waterplane-area, twin hull (SWATH) ship deploying the ROV Doc Ricketts, through a moon pool in the center of the ship. The Western Flyer supported ROV dives along much of the West Coast of North America, from the Gulf of California to Vancouver Island, as well as around the Hawaiian Islands.

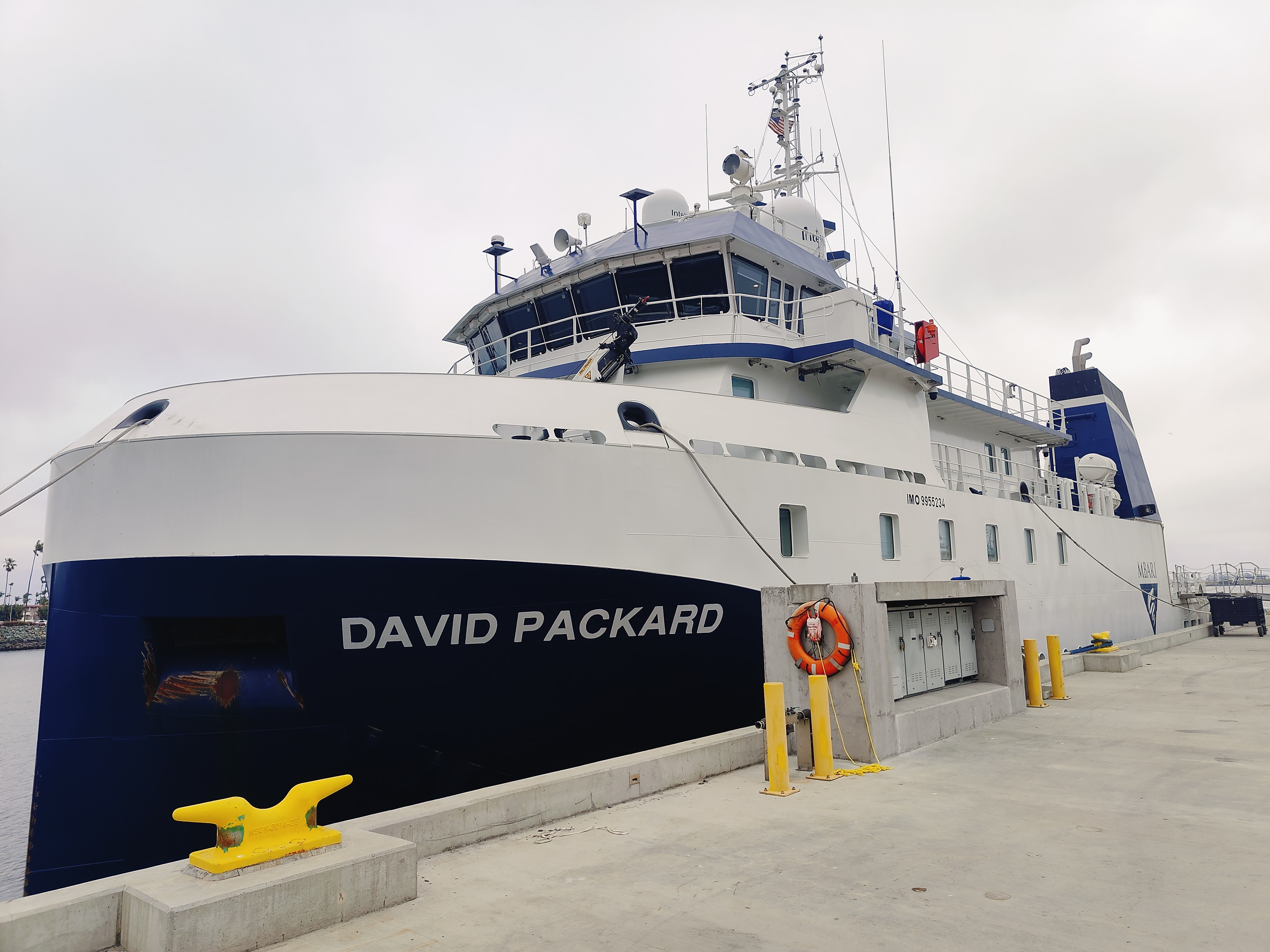
Research vessel David Packard, the successor to the Western Flyer

In 2021, MBARI announced its intention to construct a new research vessel, the RV David Packard. The ship's exterior was completed and was launched in October 2022. The ship was delivered in March 2025 and began performing science missions in summer 2025.

== Underwater vehicles ==
MBARI has been a pioneer in the development and scientific use of two types of robotic submersibles—ROVs and AUVs. ROVs are connected through a very long tether to a ship at the sea surface and are controlled by pilots and researchers on board the surface ship. AUVs are programmed and then released to collect data autonomously, with little or no human intervention.

MBARI's ROV Doc Ricketts is a 4-km-depth rated vehicle, named after pioneering marine ecologist Ed Ricketts. ROV Doc Ricketts has been deployed from the R/V Western Flyer since 2009, when it replaced ROV Tiburon, which had been deployed from the R/V Western Flyer since 1997.

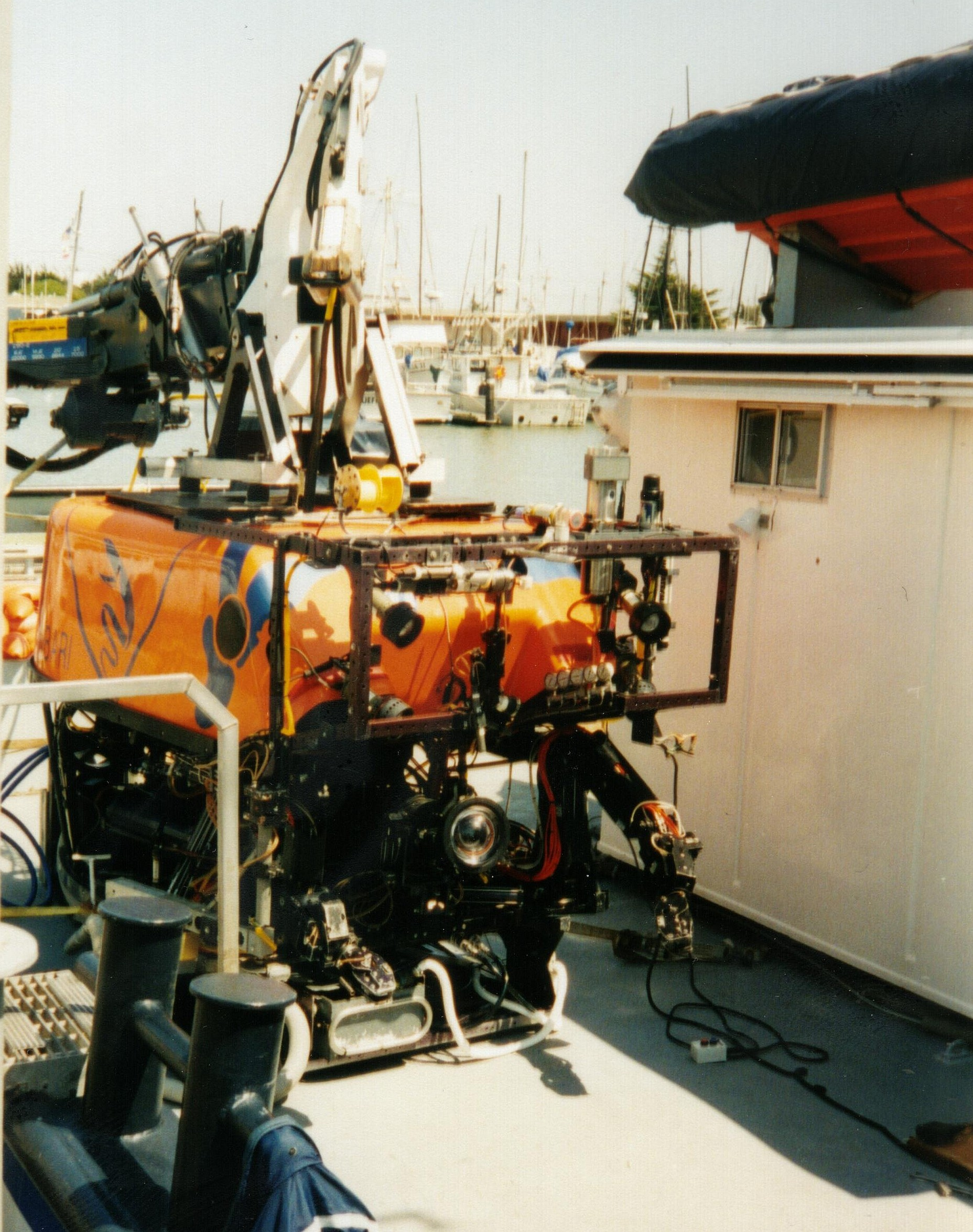
ROV Ventana on board of the MBARI research vessel Point Lobos

ROV Ventana is a 1.8-km-depth rated vehicle built for the institute by International Submarine Engineering according to specifications developed by David Packard and the original core group of scientists and engineers at MBARI. The vehicle was delivered in 1988 with a standard suite of instruments and cameras. Data collection sensors, a high-definition camera, and animal collection devices have been added over the course of more than 3,600 dives.

In addition to ROVs, MBARI has also developed untethered undersea robots called AUVs. MBARI's Dorado-class AUVs are 53.3 cm (21.0 in) in diameter and can be as short as 2.4 m (7.9 ft) or as long as 6.4 m (21 ft), depending on the mission. Dorado-class AUVs currently operational at MBARI include the upper-water-column AUV, the seafloor-mapping AUV, and the imaging AUV. The core vehicle elements are deep-rated (the mapping AUV is 6,000-m rated) and have been operated as long as 20 hours.

MBARI's new Tethys AUV, also called the long-range AUV, is designed to operate over longer ranges. Tethys is 30.5 cm (12.0 in) in diameter, 230 cm (7.5 ft) long, and weighs 120 kg. Tethys provides capabilities falling between existing propeller-driven AUVs, which typically have endurances on the order of a day, and buoyancy-driven vehicles (gliders) that can operate for many months. In October 2011, Tethys spent 24 days at sea traveling nearly 1,800 km.

== Notable achievements ==
Frequent forays with ROVs to the deep Monterey Canyon have enabled MBARI researchers to discover new animal species on a regular basis and to begin to understand their significance in the ecology of the deep sea.

Some of the more notable species first described by MBARI researchers include Stellamedusa ventana (bumpy jelly), Tiburonia granrojo (big red), Chaetopterus pugaporcinus (pigbutt worm), and the Osedax genus of bone-eating worms. Bruce Robison was also the first to observe the transparent head of the barreleye fish Macropinna microstoma.

In 2008, MBARI deployed the Monterey Accelerated Research System (MARS)—the first deep sea-cabled observatory offshore of the continental United States. MARS enables researchers to deploy a variety of scientific instruments such as earthquake monitors and low-light video cameras and leave them on the deep seafloor for extended times. Funded in 2002 by a grant from the National Science Foundation, the MARS Observatory was developed through a collaborative effort by MBARI, Woods Hole Oceanographic Institution, the University of Washington Applied Physics Laboratory, NASA's Jet Propulsion Laboratory, L-3 MariPro, and Alcatel-Lucent.

MBARI researchers have also made pioneering developments in the area of microbial oceanography. MBARI postdoctoral fellow Oded Beja and scientist Edward DeLong were the first to discover a gene in several species of bacteria responsible for production of the protein rhodopsin, previously unheard of in the domain Bacteria. First developments in several areas of metagenomics have also been made at MBARI. DeLong was among the first to use metagenomics in the ocean and MBARI scientist Alexandra Worden led the development of eukaryotic targeted metagenomics, which allows specific eukaryotic cells to be selected from natural samples and partial genomes from those uncultured cells then sequenced, assembled, and analyzed.

In 2001, MBARI scientists and engineers detected the onset and development of a harmful algal bloom using the Environmental Sample Processor (ESP)—an undersea, robotic DNA laboratory. Using the ESP, researchers are able to conduct molecular biological analyses remotely, in real time, over a sustained period, and with interactive capability. The ESP provides in situ collection and analysis of water samples, such as the analysis of the genetic material of marine microorganisms in seawater.
