= Christopher P. Costa =

U.S. intelligence officer

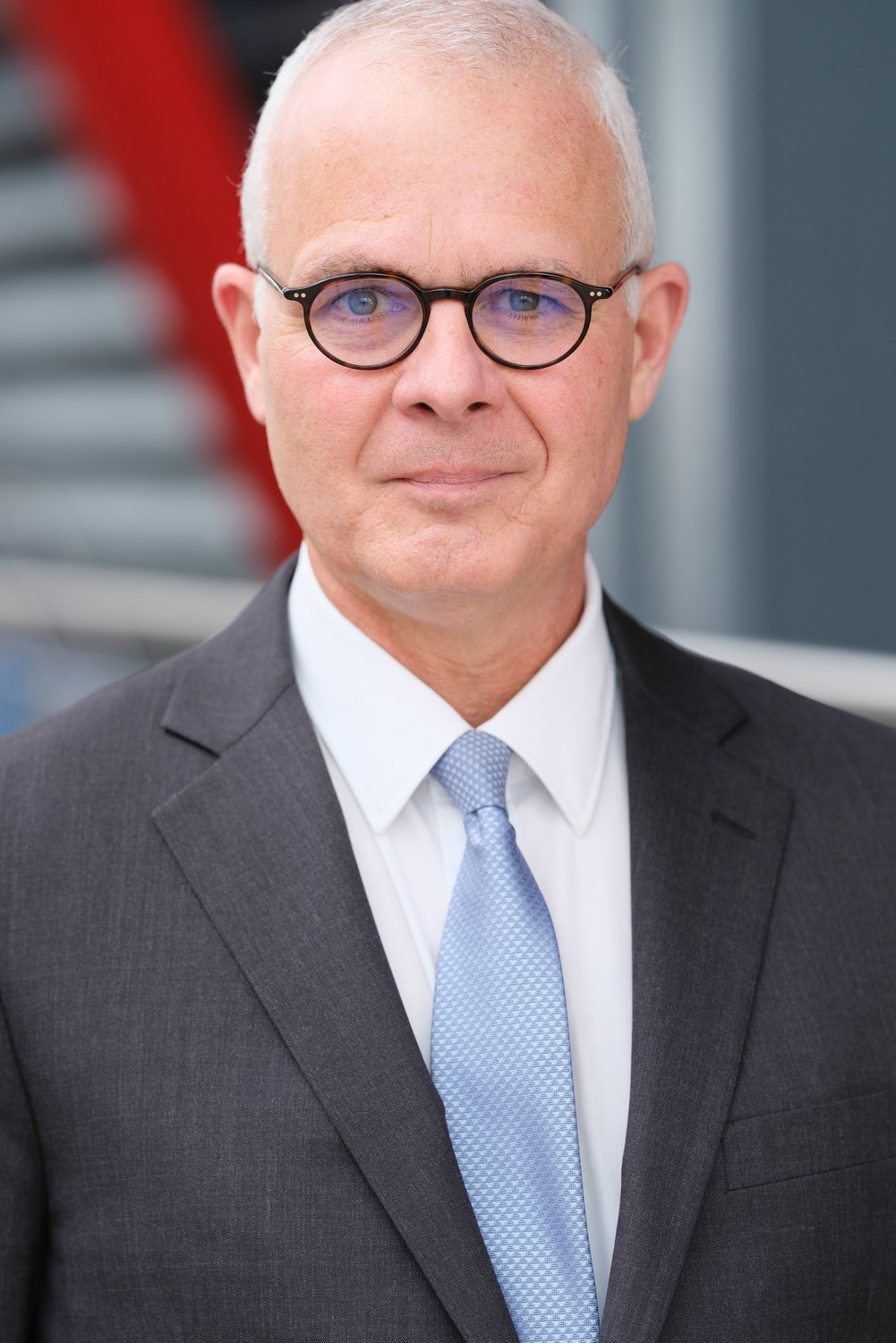
- Born: 1962 (age 63–64); West Virginia, U.S.
- Education: Norwich University, U.S. Naval War College, American Military University
- Occupation: Former intelligence officer
- Military career
- Allegiance: United States
- Branch: Army
- Service years: 1984–2009
- Rank: Colonel
- Awards: Army Achievement Medal (3); Army Commendation Ribbon (4); Meritorious Service Medal (5); Joint Service Commendation Medal (2); Defense Meritorious Service Medal (4); Bronze Star Medal (2) Legion of Merit; Defense Superior Service Medal; National Defense Service Medal (2); Armed Forces Expeditionary Medal (2); Southwest Asia Service Medal (2); Afghanistan Campaign Medal; Global War on Terrorism Expeditionary Medal; Global War on Terrorism Service Medal; Armed Forces Service Medal; Humanitarian Service Medal; Iraq Campaign Medal; Army Service Ribbon; Overseas Service Ribbon (2); NATO Medal Kuwait Liberation Medal

Christopher P. Costa (born 1962) is a retired US Army intelligence officer with 34 years of service, culminating in his role as Special Assistant to the President and Senior Director for Counterterrorism at the National Security Council, White House. He is now the executive director of the International Spy Museum.

== Background ==
Costa was 10 years old when the Munich massacre at the 1972 Olympics happened. He identified that moment as partly inspiring his decision to go into intelligence, special operations, and counterterrorism work. Costa grew up in Natick, Massachusetts and graduated from Natick High School in 1980; he was inducted into Natick High School's Wall of Achievement in 2005.

In 1984, Costa graduated with B.A. in Criminal Justice from Norwich University.

In 2002, he earned an M.A. in Strategic Intelligence from American Military University, and in 2006 he earned an M.A. in National Security and Strategic Studies from the U.S. Naval War College.

== Career ==
During his 34-year long government career, he spent 25 years in counterintelligence, human intelligence, and with special operations forces in the US Army. During that time, he was deployed to Panama, Bosnia, Afghanistan, and Iraq.

His career began in 1984 when he was commissioned in the US Army where he served in infantry and intelligence until 2009. As his roles and responsibilities increased, he took on positions such as Chief of Human and Counterintelligence for U.S. Central Command (USCENTCOM) and the Commander of a Theater Special Operations Task Force for Special Operations Command Central (SOCCENT).

From May 2009 until December 2015, Costa was with the Naval Special Warfare Development Group, where he was the first civilian squadron deputy director.

For the next two years, Costa served as Program Director of the Operations Directorate with United States Special Operations Command (USSOCOM).

He spent a year (Jan 2017-Jan 2018) as the Special Assistant to the President and Senior Director for Counterterrorism at the National Security Council, focused on coordinating counterterrorism policy, strategy, and on hostage response and recovery activities.

Costa has been the director of the International Spy Museum in Washington, DC since 2018.

He is currently an adjunct associate professor at the Security Studies Program & Center for Security Studies, Edward A. Walsh School of Foreign Service, Georgetown University. He is also on the Advisory Council of Hostage US and is on the board of directors for the Foley Foundation.

== Awards and honors ==
In May 2013, Costa was inducted into the United States Special Operations Command's (USSOCOM) Commando Hall of Honor. He has two Bronze Stars for human intelligence work in Afghanistan, as well as the Defense Superior Service Medal and the Legion of Merit. In 2024, he was awarded the James W. Foley American Hostage Freedom Award.

== Bibliography ==
- Christopher P. Costa & Colin P. Clarke (2024) "We Still Haven't Figured Out How to Beat ISIS" The New York Times
- Joseph L. Votel & Christopher P. Costa (2024) "Maintaining the best thing the US built in Iraq: Continued support to the Iraqi Counterterrorism Service" Middle East Institute
- Christopher P. Costa (2023) "9/11, Benghazi and US counterterrorism's long arm of justice," The Hill.
- Christopher P. Costa & Jeffrey Kaplan (2023) Homegrown tribalism: would-be al-Qaeda subway bombers and an ISIS defector, Journal of Policing, Intelligence and Counter Terrorism, doi:10.1080/18335330.2023.2209575
- Matthew Levitt, Katrina Mulligan, & Christopher Costa, Rethinking U.S. Counterterrorism Two Decades After 9/11 in U.S. Counterterrorism Reimagined: Tracking the Biden Administration's Effort to Reform How America Addresses Violent Extremism by Matthew Levitt, Washington, DC: The Washington Institute for Near East Policy, 15–19, 2022
- Christopher P. Costa, Foreword, in Dan E. Stigall, Counterterrorism and Investigative Detention, Massachusetts: Edward Elgar Publishing Limited. 2021. ISBN 978-1-80088-718-3
- Christopher P. Costa, Post 9/11 policy, strategy and military reflections on the impact malign tribalism and future threats, in Jeffrey Kaplan, Radical Religion and Violence, London: Routledge, 2015. ISBN 978-0-415-81414-0
- Jeffrey Kaplan & Christopher P. Costa, Nov. 2015 The Islamic State and the New Tribalism in Terrorism and Political Violence, 27:5, 926–969, doi:10.1080/09546553.2015.1094306
- Jeffrey Kaplan & Christopher P. Costa, 2015 On Tribalism: Auxiliaries, Affiliates, and Lone Wolf Political Violence, in Terrorism and Political Violence, 26:1, 13–44, doi:10.1080/09546553.2014.849907
- Christopher P. Costa, 2006 Phoenix Rises Again: HUMINT Lessons for Counterinsurgency Operations in Defense Intelligence Journal, 15:1
