= USS Crockett (PG-88) =

Gunboat of the United States Navy

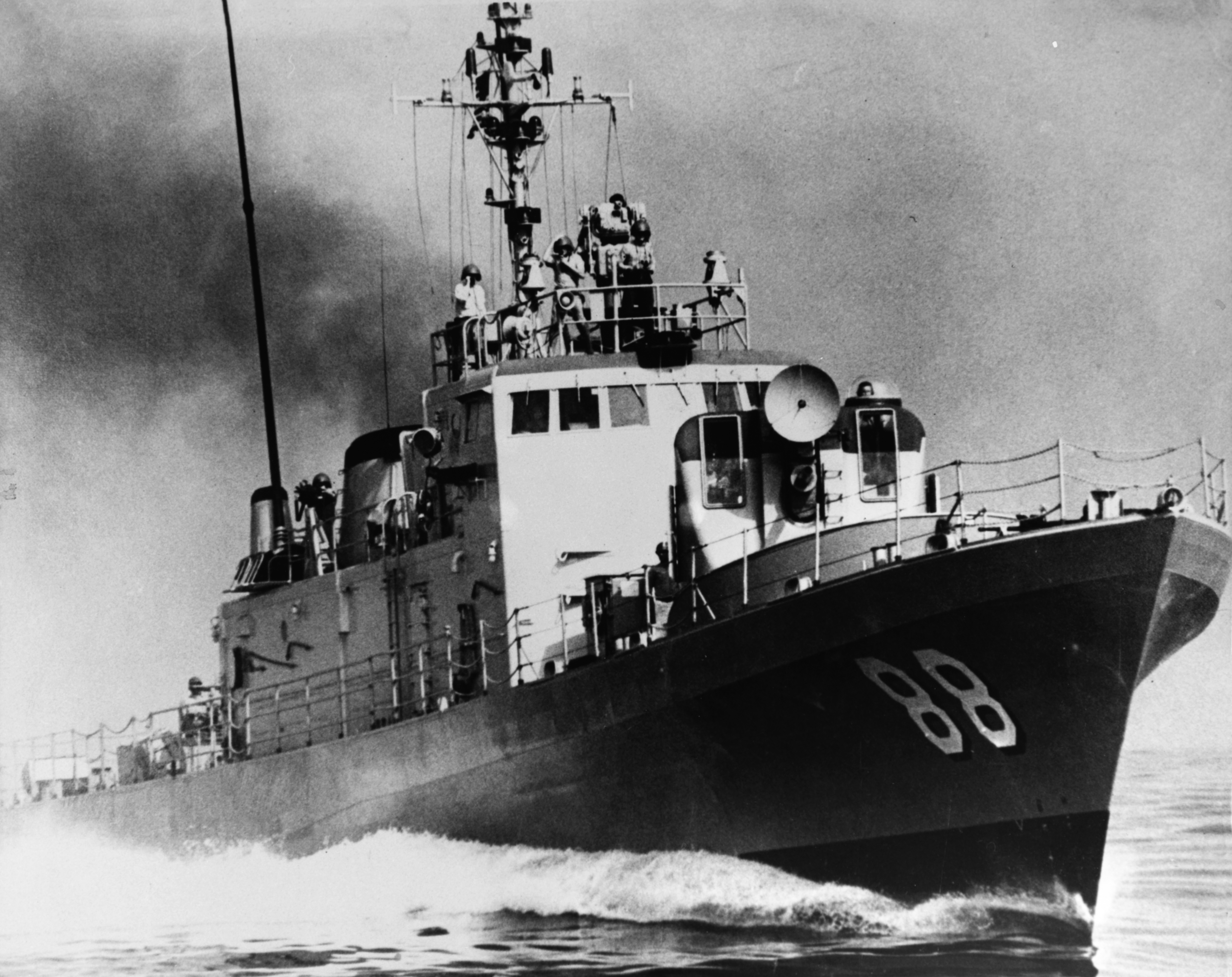

History

United States
- Name: USS Crockett (PG-88)
- Namesake: Crockett, California
- Builder: Tacoma Boatbuilding Company
- Launched: 4 June 1966
- Commissioned: 24 June 1967
- Decommissioned: 1 October 1976
- Stricken: 15 December 1976
- Fate: Transferred to EPA, 1977, Scrapped c. 1986

General characteristics
- Class & type: Asheville-class gunboat
- Displacement: 245 long tons (249 t)
- Length: 164 ft 6 in (50.14 m)
- Beam: 23 ft 11 in (7.29 m)
- Draft: 5 ft 4 in (1.63 m)
- Propulsion: CODAG; 2 × 725 hp (541 kW) VT-12 875M Cummins diesel engines; 1 × 1,370 shp (1,022 kW) General Electric LM 1500 gas turbine engine; 2 shafts
- Speed: 40 knots (74 km/h; 46 mph)
- Complement: 4 officers, 25 enlisted
- Armament: 1 × 3"/50 caliber gun; 1 × 40 mm gun; 2 × twin .50 cal (12.7 mm) machine guns

The second USS Crockett (PGM-88/PG-88) was a Asheville-class gunboat in the United States Navy during the Vietnam War.

Crockett was laid down by the Tacoma Boatbuilding Company, Tacoma, Washington, and commissioned 24 June 1967.

Homeported in San Diego, Crockett served off the coast of Vietnam as part of Operation Market Time.

Crockett transferred to the Naval Reserve Force on 1 July 1975 and was decommissioned on 1 October 1976. On 15 December 1976, she was struck from the Naval Vessel Register, and on 1 April 1977, ownership was transferred to the Environmental Protection Agency.

== R/V Rachel Carson ==
Once transferred to the EPA, the vessel was renamed for American environmentalist Rachel Carson. At the time, it was the largest limnological vessel on the Great Lakes, and her initial use was monitoring and analyzing pollution in Lake Erie.

Rachel Carson was declared excess to EPA needs in 1982 and was transferred to the state of Illinois, and thence to the Combined Great Lakes Navy Association. In 1985 it was proposed that she be moved to Muskegon, Michigan along with USS Silversides as an exhibit in the naval museum there.

She was scrapped at around 1986.
