= RV Rachel Carson (2008) =

History

United States
- Name: Rachel Carson
- Namesake: Rachel Carson
- Operator: University of Maryland Center for Environmental Science
- Builder: Hike Metal Products, Wheatley, Ontario
- Cost: USD$4.6m
- Christened: November 16, 2008
- In service: 2009
- Homeport: Solomons, Maryland
- Identification: MMSI number: 367380790; Callsign: WDE6481
- Status: In service

General characteristics
- Type: Research vessel
- Tonnage: 78 GT; 60 DWT
- Length: 81 ft (25 m) o/a
- Beam: 18 ft (5.5 m)
- Draft: 4 ft 8 in (1.42 m)
- Installed power: Two MTU 10V 2000 M-72 diesel engines, 2 × 1,205 hp (899 kW)
- Propulsion: Two Hamilton HM 651 water jets; 30 hp (22 kW) Wesmar V2-12 bow thruster
- Speed: 24 knots (44 km/h; 28 mph)
- Capacity: Up to 5 persons overnight; maximum of 30 for educational cruises
- Crew: 2

RV Rachel Carson is a research vessel owned and operated by the University of Maryland Center for Environmental Science, named in honor of the marine biologist and writer Rachel Carson.

The 81-foot aluminum-hulled vessel is an extended and modified Challenger class fast research vessel, designed by marine architect Roger Long. It is equipped with twin 1,200 horsepower diesel engines and water jet drives which give a maximum speed of 24 knots. A dynamic positioning system automatically maintains the vessel's position.

The ship was built by Hike Metal Products of Wheatley, Ontario, at a cost of $4.6 million, and christened by Katie O'Malley on November 16, 2008, at Annapolis.

The Rachel Carson has operated in Chesapeake Bay since early 2009, teaching estuarine sampling techniques, carrying out water quality surveys, plankton collection, box coring operations, and deploying instrument packages.
