= RV Point Lobos =

Research vessel

History

United States
- Name: Lolita Chouest (1981-1987); RV Point Lobos (1987-present)
- Owner: Monterey Bay Aquarium Research Institute (1987-2011)
- Launched: 1981
- Out of service: Retired in December 2011

General characteristics
- Class & type: Research vessel
- Displacement: 440 tons
- Length: 110 ft (34 m)
- Beam: 26 ft (7.9 m)
- Draught: 8 ft (2.4 m)
- Installed power: 1200 shp
- Speed: 12 kn (14 mph)
- Range: 5,000 nmi (5,800 mi) at 11 kn (13 mph)

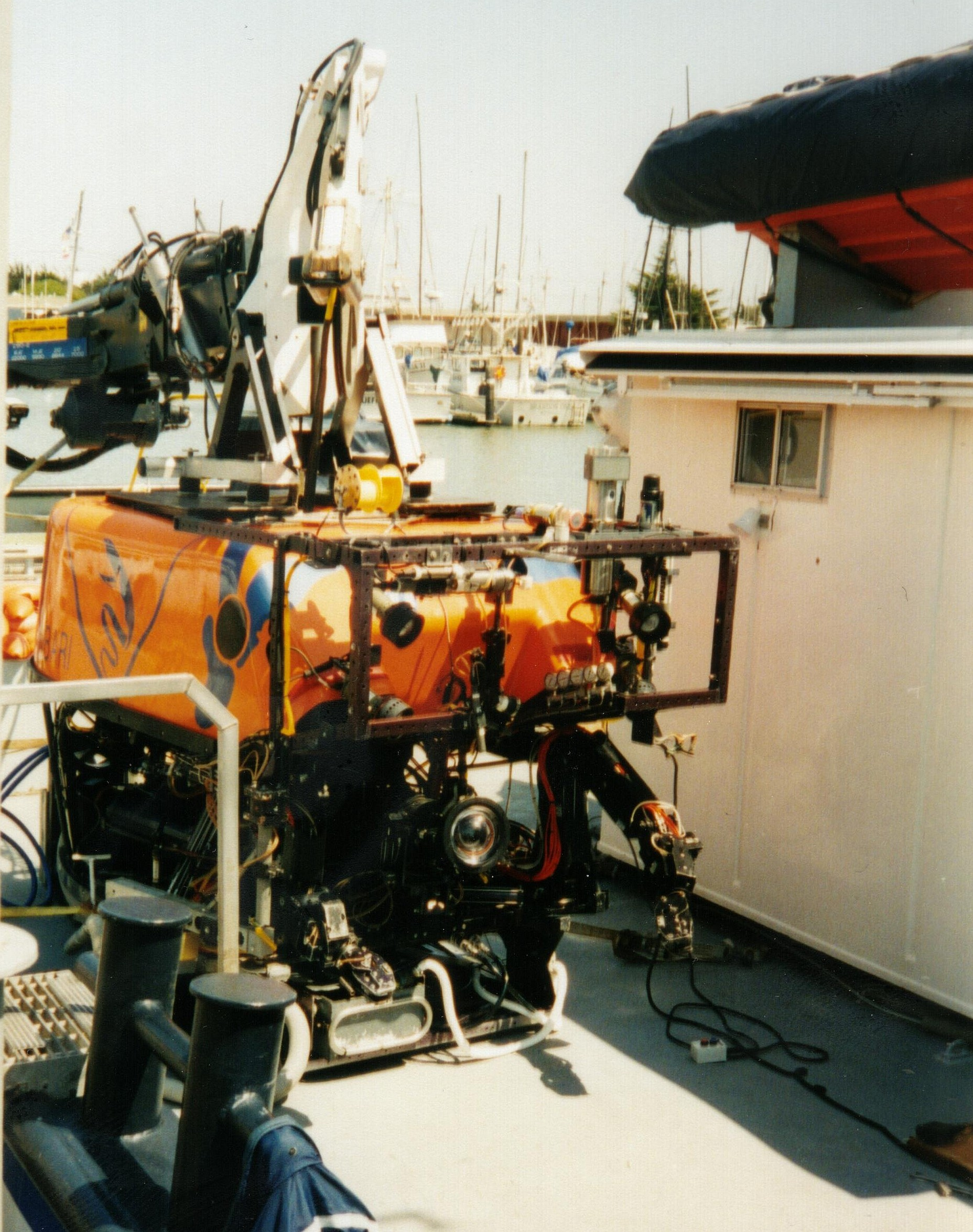
Ventana on board of Point Lobos

RV Point Lobos was a research vessel operated by the Monterey Bay Aquarium Research Institute (MBARI). It was the platform of operations for the ROV Ventana.

== Specifications ==
Fuel Capacity: 10,000 gal
Potable Water: 2500 gal
Ballast: 44,500 gal (bunker capacity)
Lube Oil: 350 ga; hydraulic oil: 350 gal
Sewage: 250 Gal

ENGINEERING MACHINERY
2 Detroit Diesel 16V92 main engines.
2 Twin Disk 520 Reduction Gears
2 150 kW Northern Lights Gen Sets
1 Kaiser SM-11 rotary screw air compressor
1 Independent Hydraulic System

DECK MACHINERY
1 Hiab 290 Sea Crane
1 Jeamar Hydraulic Winch #8-3007 aft
1 Jeamar 480 Electric Winch #83007 forward
1 2500m heave compensated Tether Management System

SAFETY EQUIPMENT
1 300# CO_{2} Fixed Engine Room Extinguisher
3 Fixed Sea Water Hose Stations (2 deck, 1 engine room)
1 ACR 121.5/406MHZ EPIRB

ELECTRONICS/COMMUNICATIONS
Call Sign WDE5005
3 VHF Horizon Galaxy, Horizon Titan, Icom IC M-100
1 SSB IC M-700 radio
1 Telex Ship Board Comms System, cw telex BTR 200 wireless
1 Raytheon Ray 410 Loud Hailer
1 Motorola Cellular SCN 2449A
1 Furuno FR-1510D 72 mile Radar
1 Trimble 4000DL Differential GPS + Garmin GPS with CG diff GPS 100
1 Sperry MK37 Gyro Compass
1 Furuno FCV252 Depth Sounder
