= University of Maryland Center for Environmental Science =

Scientific research center in the University System of Maryland

Coordinates: 38.58486°N 76.13782°W

- Type: Public
- Established: 1925
- President: Fernando Miralles-Wilhelm
- Location: Cambridge, Maryland, United States
- Campus: Multiple
- Website: www.umces.edu

The University of Maryland Center for Environmental Science (UMCES) is a multi-university scientific research center within the University System of Maryland dedicated to environmental science, estuarine studies, and marine science.

Its origins are found in a 1925 research station on Solomons Island. In 1973 it became the Center for Environmental and Estuarine Studies and in 1997 it assumed its current name.

The center focuses on environmental research and education in Maryland, United States, with special attention to problems of the Chesapeake Bay, and includes climate research. Research programs are undertaken across the US and globally. Its educational opportunities include graduate studies and undergraduate research internships. The center has about 60 faculty and 110 graduate students. Donald Boesch served as the institution's president from 1990 until 2017, and has been succeeded by Peter Goodwin.

UMCES programs are conducted at five constituent research locations:

- Appalachian Laboratory (Frostburg, Maryland) in cooperation with Frostburg State University.
- Chesapeake Biological Laboratory (Solomons, Maryland)
- Horn Point Laboratory (Cambridge, Maryland)
- Institute of Marine and Environmental Technology (Baltimore, Maryland) in cooperation with the University of Maryland, Baltimore and the University of Maryland, Baltimore County.
- Maryland Sea Grant College (College Park, Maryland) in cooperation with the University of Maryland, College Park - UMD College of Agriculture and Natural Resources and the National Oceanic and Atmospheric Administration.

The Center also administers the Integration and Application Network, which provides scientific data, reports and visualization tools for researchers, students and the general public.
