= Natrona, Pennsylvania =

Unincorporated community in Pennsylvania, US

- Unincorporated community
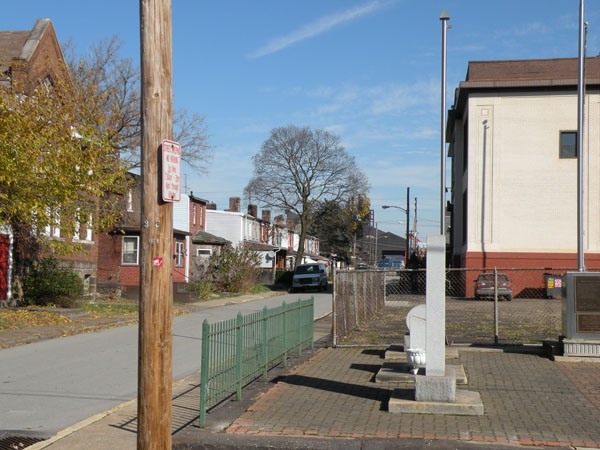
- The Pennsalt Historic District, settled c. 1850, in Natrona

- Location within the state of Pennsylvania Natrona (the United States)
- Coordinates: 40°36′52″N 79°43′21″W
- Country: United States
- State: Pennsylvania
- County: Allegheny
- Township: Harrison
- Elevation: 758 ft (231 m)
- Time zone: UTC-5 (Eastern (EST))
  - Summer (DST): UTC-4 (EDT)
- ZIP codes: 15065
- Area codes: 724, 878
- GNIS feature ID: 1182182
- Website: http://harrisontwp.com/

Natrona is an unincorporated community in Harrison Township, Allegheny County, Pennsylvania. It is located in western Pennsylvania within the Pittsburgh Metropolitan Statistical Area, approximately 24 miles (39 km) northeast of Downtown Pittsburgh. Natrona is situated along the Allegheny River at Lock and Dam Four, Pools Three and Four between Brackenridge, Natrona Heights, Karns, Allegheny Township, and Lower Burrell.

== History ==
The original village of Natrona – then known as East Tarentum – was built as a company town by the Pennsylvania Salt Manufacturing Company in the 1850s. It received its name from "natron", a naturally occurring mineral composed primarily of sodium carbonate and sodium bicarbonate.

The company began with two salt wells in 1850, and continued operations until 1959. By 1876, the company, which owned the cryolite deposits of Greenland, brought the crude mineral to its works in Natrona, where the mineral was pulverized, sifted, heated, reacted with calcium carbonate and leached to produce pure carbonate of soda (sodium carbonate) and aluminate of soda (sodium aluminate).

=== Canal ===
The Pennsylvania Canal once passed through Natrona and nearby communities in the early- to mid-19th century.

=== Railroads ===
The Pennsylvania Railroad had a train station in Natrona at Vine and Federal streets; its rail line began running through the town in the mid-19th century. Later, the Pennsylvania Railroad merged with rival New York Central Railroad in 1968 to form the Penn Central Transportation Company. The Interstate Commerce Commission required that the ailing New York, New Haven and Hartford Railroad be added in 1969. The Consolidated Rail Corporation replaced the Penn Central Transportation Company and operated freight service through Natrona from 1976 until 1999 when it was divided between two companies. The Norfolk Southern Railway then operated trains through the town. Amtrak has detoured passenger service through Natrona on occasion; its nearest station is Penn Station in Downtown Pittsburgh.

The West Penn Railways provided electric street car service to Natrona from 1906 until 1937.

Local factories, beginning with the Pennsylvania Salt Manufacturing Company's Natrona Works, also operated trains through Natrona. As of 2011, Allegheny Technologies used a track to transport materials between departments at its Allegheny Ludlum Brackenridge Works.

=== Mining ===
The Pennsylvania Salt Manufacturing Company operated its Natrona No. 1 and Natrona No. 2 bituminous coal mines at Natrona.

== Geography ==
Natrona is situated on an alluvial floodplain along the Allegheny River.

== Demographics ==
Historical population
Census	Pop.	Note	%±

The United States Census Bureau defined Natrona as a census designated place (CDP) in 2023.

== Education ==
The community is located within the Highlands School District. Highlands High School and Highlands Middle School are located in Natrona Heights. Air pollution levels (particularly chromium) measured in Natrona area schools are among the worst in the United States.

== In film ==
=== Knightriders ===
The film Knightriders (1981) by George A. Romero starring Ed Harris used scenes shot on Garfield Street in Natrona (1980) for the movie. Most of the film was shot in nearby Fawn Township.

=== Striking Distance ===
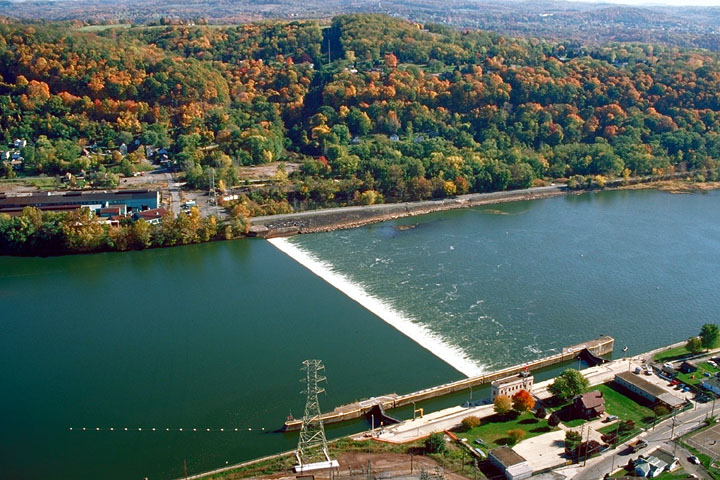
The Lock and Dam Number Four spans the Allegheny River between Natrona in Harrison Township (below) and Lower Burrell (above).

Also, the film Striking Distance (1993) starring Bruce Willis and Sarah Jessica Parker uses a sequence where boats jump over the dam at Natrona; the Tarentum Bridge can be seen just above the dam over Jacks Island, although the structure was added there later through editing. The bridge is officially named the George D. Stuart Bridge (part of Pennsylvania Route 366) and actually located about 2.5 miles (4.0 km) downstream spanning the river between Tarentum and New Kensington.

== Notable people ==
- Leon Czolgosz, the assassin of U.S. President William McKinley in 1901, spent part of his teenage years working at a glass factory located in the town.
- Evelyn Nesbit, American artists' model, chorus girl, and actress born in Natrona. She is best known for her years as a teenager and young woman in New York City, particularly her extensive modeling work for artists and her alleged rape in her teen years and her role as the focal point in a deadly love triangle between railroad scion Harry Kendall Thaw and the prominent architect Stanford White.

== See also ==
- Superfund site
- Samuel Kier operated salt and oil wells in the 19th century at Natrona.
- National Register of Historic Places listings in Allegheny County, Pennsylvania
- Natrona Bottling Company – a local manufacturer of soft drink beverages
- Rachel Carson lived in nearby Springdale during her youth.
