= Karns, Pennsylvania =

Unincorporated community in Pennsylvania, U.S.

- Unincorporated community
- Location within Pennsylvania
- Coordinates: 40°37′49″N 79°42′13″W
- Country: United States of America
- State: Pennsylvania
- County: Allegheny
- Township: Harrison
- Elevation: 817 ft (249 m)

Karns is an unincorporated community in Harrison Township, Allegheny County, Pennsylvania, United States; it is located in Western Pennsylvania within the Pittsburgh Metropolitan Statistical Area, approximately 24 miles (39 km) northeast of Pittsburgh. Karns is situated along the Allegheny River at Pool 4 across from Jacks Island just above Lock and Dam 4 between Natrona, Natrona Heights, and Sligo. The elevation of Karns is 817 feet above sea level.

The postal ZIP code is 15065, while the telephone area codes are 724 and 878; although the code 878 is not used.

== History ==
The Pennsylvania Railroad ran through Karns, which had a small station; nearby stations were also at Sligo and Natrona.

== Education ==
The community is located within the Highlands School District. Highlands High School and Highlands Middle School are located in Natrona Heights. Air pollution levels (particularly chromium) measured in Karns area schools are among the worst in the United States.
