= Natrona Heights, Pennsylvania =

Unincorporated community in the U.S. state of Pennsylvania

- Unincorporated community
- Location within the U.S. state of Pennsylvania Natrona; Heights (the United States)
- Coordinates: 40°37′24″N 79°43′47″W
- Country: United States
- State: Pennsylvania
- County: Allegheny
- Township: Harrison
- Elevation: 994 ft (303 m)
- Time zone: UTC-5 (Eastern (EST))
  - Summer (DST): UTC-4 (EDT)
- ZIP codes: 15065
- Area codes: 724, 878
- GNIS feature ID: 1182183

Natrona Heights is an unincorporated community in Harrison Township, Allegheny County, Pennsylvania, United States. It is located in Western Pennsylvania within the Pittsburgh Metropolitan Statistical Area, approximately 24 miles (39 km) northeast of Pittsburgh. Natrona Heights is situated near the Allegheny River, Natrona, Brackenridge, and Tarentum.

== Demographics ==
Historical population
| Census | Pop. | Note | %± |

The United States Census Bureau defined Natrona Heights as a census designated place (CDP) in 2023.

== Culture ==
Natrona Heights is home to the Pittsburgh and Tarentum Campmeeting Association, a multi-denominational Methodist-founded group established in 1849. The community is also home to the Pittsburgh Buddhist Center. The town's first structure, the Burtner House, still stands and is open for festivals several times a year. The Community Library of Allegheny Valley, Harrison Branch also serves Natrona Heights.

== Education ==
The community is within the Highlands School District. Highlands High School and Highlands Middle School are in Natrona Heights. Private schools include Our Lady of the Most Blessed Sacrament Elementary School and Saint Joseph High School.

== Usage in popular culture ==
=== Knightriders ===
The film Knightriders (1981) by George A. Romero starring Ed Harris used scenes shot on Pennsylvania Avenue and in a restaurant on Freeport Road in Natrona Heights, as well as several scenes in neighboring Natrona for the movie. Most of the film was shot in nearby Fawn Township.

=== Promised Land ===
During interviews for the film Promised Land (2012) which was shot in Western Pennsylvania, star John Krasinski revealed that his father Ronald had grown up in the Natrona Heights area.

== Notable people ==
- Greg Christy, former professional football player, Buffalo Bills
- Jeff Christy, former professional football player, Minnesota Vikings and Tampa Bay Buccaneers
- John Filo, Pulitzer Prize winning photojournalist
- Cookie Gilchrist, former professional football player, Buffalo Bills, Denver Broncos, and Miami Dolphins
- Larry J. Kulick, for bishop of the Diocese of Greensburg
- Robert W. Olszewski, painter and miniatures artist
- Heather Pressdee, nurse charged with mass murdering patients by lethal injections
- Ed Sikov, American film scholar and author
- Tom Young, basketball coach

== See also ==
- Environmentalism – Natrona Heights has a United States Environmental Protection Agency Superfund site
- National Register of Historic Places listings in Allegheny County, Pennsylvania
