= Rachel Carson House =

Rachel Carson House may refer to:

- Rachel Carson House (Colesville, Maryland), where Rachel Carson wrote Silent Spring, listed on the U.S. National Register of Historic Places (NRHP), and designated a National Historic Landmark
- Rachel Carson Homestead, Rachel Carson's birthplace and childhood home in Springdale, Pennsylvania, also listed on the NRHP as Rachel Carson House
