= Clinton Township, Butler County, Pennsylvania =

Township in Pennsylvania, US

Coordinates: 40°42′24″N 79°49′43″W

- Township
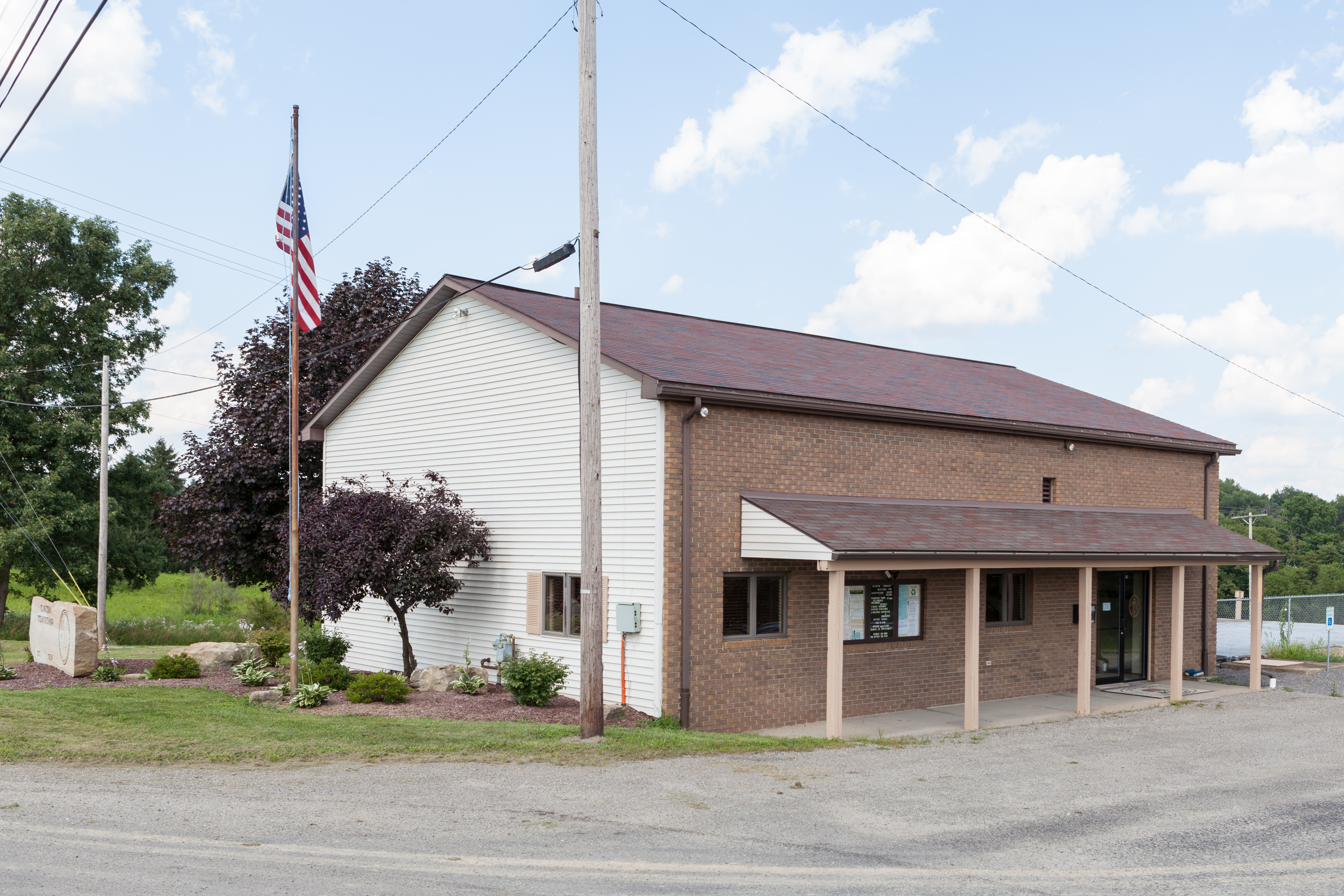
- Municipal Building at 711 Saxonburg Blvd., Saxonburg, PA

- Seal

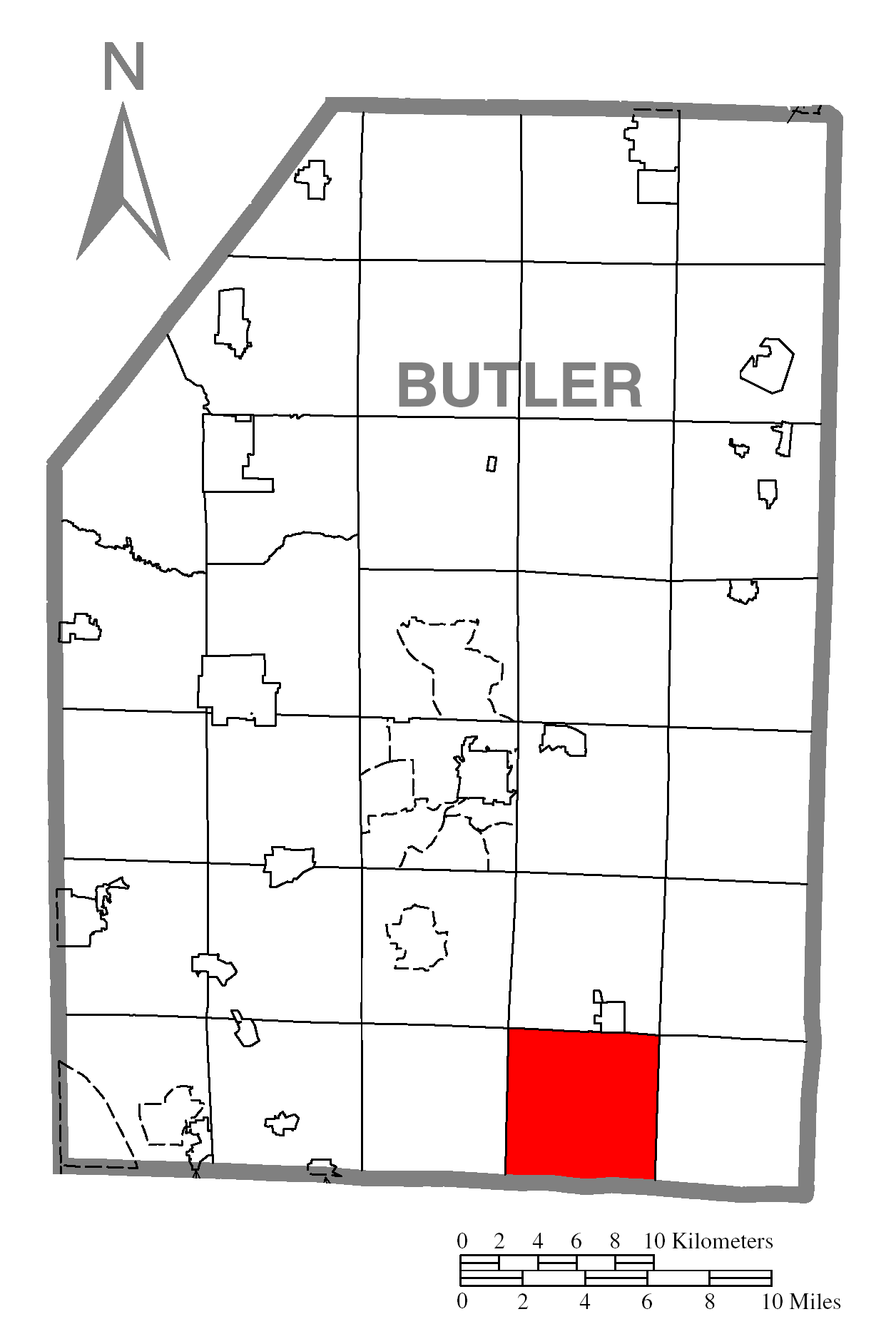
- Map of Butler County, Pennsylvania, highlighting Clinton Township

- Map of Butler County, Pennsylvania
- Country: United States
- State: Pennsylvania
- County: Butler
- Settled: 1792
- Incorporated: 1854

Area
  - Total: 23.56 sq mi (61.02 km^{2})
  - Land: 23.55 sq mi (61.00 km^{2})
  - Water: 0.0077 sq mi (0.02 km^{2})

Population (2020)
  - Total: 2,913 ▲
  - Estimate (2022): 2,875
  - Density: 120.1/sq mi (46.36/km^{2})
- Time zone: UTC-5 (Eastern (EST))
  - Summer (DST): UTC-4 (EDT)
- FIPS code: 42-019-14320
- Website: www.myclintontwp.net

Clinton Township is a township in Butler County, Pennsylvania, United States. The population was 2,913 at the 2020 census. For generations, it was home to a U.S. Steel plant.

== Geography ==
Clinton Township is located in southern Butler County, along the Allegheny County border. It contains the unincorporated communities of Cunningham, Lardintown, and Ivywood. It is bordered by the borough of Saxonburg to the north.

According to the United States Census Bureau, the township has a total area of 23.6 square miles (61.0 km^{2}), of which 0.008 square miles (0.02 km^{2}), or 0.03%, is water.

=== Streams ===
Rocky Run joins Bull Creek near the intersection of Saxonburg Boulevard and Cherry Valley Road in Clinton Township. Lardintown Run flows south from its source into Fawn Township in Allegheny County. The majority of the township is in the watershed of the Allegheny River, a tributary of the Ohio River. Streams in the northwestern corner of the township, however, flow to Connoquenessing Creek, a tributary of the Beaver River, another tributary of the Ohio.

== Demographics ==
Historical population
Census	Pop.	Note	%±
2010	2,864		—
2020	2,913		1.7%
2022 (est.)	2,875		−1.3%
U.S. Decennial Census

As of the 2000 census, there were 2,779 people, 1,043 households, and 790 families residing in the township. The population density was 116.7 inhabitants per square mile (45.1/km^{2}). There were 1,075 housing units at an average density of 45.1 per square mile (17.4/km^{2}). The racial makeup of the township was 98.56% White, 0.14% African American, 0.04% Native American, 0.11% Asian, and 1.15% from two or more races. Hispanic or Latino of any race were 0.40% of the population.

There were 1,043 households, out of which 34.3% had children under the age of 18 living with them, 67.5% were married couples living together, 5.0% had a female householder with no husband present, and 24.2% were non-families. 19.6% of all households were made up of individuals, and 8.1% had someone living alone who was 65 years of age or older. The average household size was 2.66 and the average family size was 3.09.

In the township the population was spread out, with 25.2% under the age of 18, 5.7% from 18 to 24, 31.4% from 25 to 44, 26.3% from 45 to 64, and 11.4% who were 65 years of age or older. The median age was 39 years. For every 100 females, there were 102.6 males. For every 100 females age 18 and over, there were 98.1 males.

The median income for a household in the township was $44,494, and the median income for a family was $50,625. Males had a median income of $37,829 versus $21,971 for females. The per capita income for the township was $19,874. About 5.1% of families and 7.5% of the population were below the poverty line, including 9.1% of those under age 18 and 7.6% of those age 65 or over.

== Education ==
The township is in the Knoch School District (formerly the South Butler County School District).
