= List of islands by name (J) =

This article features a list of islands sorted by their name beginning with the letter J.

Island's name	Island group(s)	Country/Countries
Jack	Washington	United States
Jacks	Allegheny River, Pennsylvania	United States
Jackson	Franz Josef Land	Russia
Jackson	Mississippi River, Iowa	United States
Jaluit Atoll		Marshall Islands
Jamaica	Greater Antilles	Jamaica
Jamestown	James River, Virginia	United States
Jan Mayen		Norway
Java	Sunda Arc	Indonesia
Jef Fam Group	Raja Ampat Islands	Indonesia
Jegindø	The Limfjord	Denmark
Jeju		South Korea
Jemo		Marshall Islands
Jersey	Channel Islands	(United Kingdom) Crown dependency
Jethou	Channel Islands	(United Kingdom) Crown dependency
Jintang	Zhoushan Archipelago	China
Joes	Lake Winnipesaukee, New Hampshire	United States
Johns	San Juan Islands, Washington	United States
Johnson	Missouri River, Missouri	United States
Johnson	French Broad River, Tennessee	United States
Jones	Missouri River, South Dakota	United States
Jonobi	Persian Gulf	Iran
Juananga	Juan Fernández Islands	Chile
Just Enough Room	Thousand Islands	Canada
Juist	East Frisian Islands	Germany
Jura	Inner Hebrides	Scotland
Juromenha	Alentejo islands	Portugal

== See also ==
- List of islands (by country)
- List of islands by area
- List of islands by population
- List of islands by highest point
