= Dick Modzelewski =

American football player and coach (1931–2018)

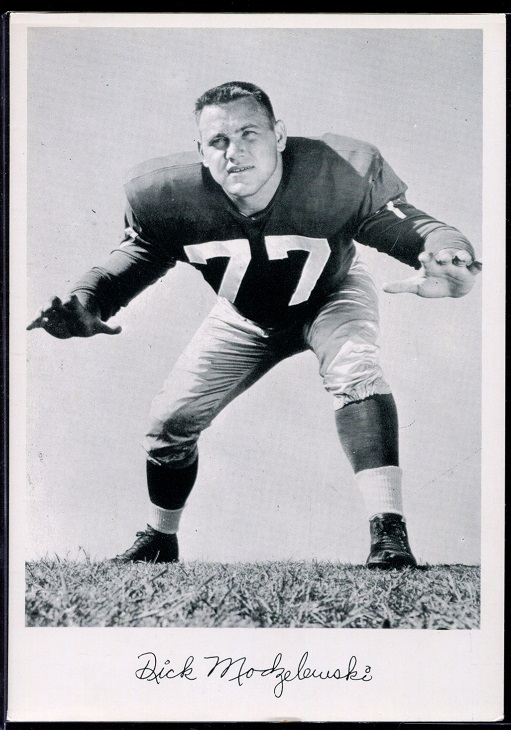
- 1956 photo

No. 70, 79, 77, 74
- Position: Defensive tackle

Personal information
- Born: February 16, 1931; West Natrona, Pennsylvania, U.S.
- Died: October 19, 2018 (aged 87); Eastlake, Ohio, U.S.
- Listed height: 6 ft 0 in (1.83 m)
- Listed weight: 250 lb (113 kg)

Career information
- High school: Natrona Heights (PA) Har-Brack
- College: Maryland
- NFL draft: 1953: 2nd round, 16th overall pick

Career history

Playing
- Washington Redskins (1953–1954); Pittsburgh Steelers (1955); New York Giants (1956–1963); Cleveland Browns (1964–1966)

Coaching
- Cleveland Browns (1968–1975) Defensive line; Cleveland Browns (1976) Defensive coordinator; Cleveland Browns (1977) Interim head coach/defensive coordinator; New York Giants (1978) Defensive coordinator; Cincinnati Bengals (1979–1983) Defensive line; Green Bay Packers (1984–1987) Defensive coordinator/defensive line; Detroit Lions (1988–1989) Defensive line

Awards and highlights
- 2× NFL champion (1956, 1964); Pro Bowl (1964); 63rd greatest New York Giant of all-time; Outland Trophy (1952); Consensus All-American (1952); Second-team All-American (1951)

Career NFL statistics
- Sacks: 32.5
- Fumble recoveries: 12
- Safeties: 2
- Stats at Pro Football Reference

Head coaching record
- Regular season: 0–1–0 (.000)
- Coaching profile at Pro Football Reference
- College Football Hall of Fame

Richard Blair Modzelewski (February 16, 1931 – October 19, 2018) was an American professional football defensive tackle in the National Football League (NFL) for the Washington Redskins, Pittsburgh Steelers, New York Giants, and Cleveland Browns. He also served as interim head coach of the Browns in the final game of the 1977 season. Modzelewski was inducted into the College Football Hall of Fame in 1993.

== Early life ==
Growing up in West Natrona, Pennsylvania, as one of six children, Modzelewski was a three-sport athlete at Har-Brack High School (now Highlands High School).

== College career ==
Modzelewski joined his brother, Ed, and played college football at the University of Maryland. Just as he was set to begin his sophomore season, Modzelewski moved into the starting lineup after an injury to the Terrapins' Ray Krouse.

He would keep that status for the next three years, winning All-American honors as both a junior and senior, while also capturing the 1952 Outland Trophy. In a 1951 game against the University of North Carolina, Modzelewski paced a defense with 12 solo tackles, while the team held the Tar Heels to just 40 yards of offense. At the end of that season, Maryland was ranked third in the country and knocked off the top-ranked University of Tennessee Volunteers in the Sugar Bowl.

=== Washington Redskins ===
The Washington Redskins took notice of Modzelewski's accomplishments and drafted him in the second round of the 1953 NFL draft, signing him on April 10. In his two years with the team, Modzelewski showed promise as a rookie, then began having conflicts with Redskins' coach Joe Kuharich in 1954. As a result, Modzelewski signed with the Calgary Stampeders of the Canadian Football League, ready to play for former Maryland assistant coach Jack Hennemier. However, after the Redskins filed an injunction to stop the deal, the Stampeders signed an agreement to tear up the contract.

=== Pittsburgh Steelers ===
With Modzelewski unhappy, the Redskins traded him to the Pittsburgh Steelers on March 1, 1955, once again reuniting him with brother Ed, a fullback on the team. The brothers would not play together, though, as Ed was traded to the Cleveland Browns as a replacement for retiring Hall of Famer Marion Motley, with whom he won the NFL Championship. Dick was once again traded, this time twice in a four-day span. On April 24, 1956, he was traded to the Detroit Lions, then was dealt three days later to the New York Giants. In an ironic twist, the player the Lions received was Krouse, whose 1950 injury at Maryland had led to Modzelewski's development.

=== New York Giants ===
Over the next eight seasons, the Giants played for the NFL championship six times, but their only victory came during Modzelewski's first season in 1956. Among a colorful group of defenders, Modzelewski's low-key approach often saw him remain in the shadow of these players, but his presence helped the team remain a perennial title contender.

=== Cleveland Browns ===
On March 4, 1964, Modzelewski was traded to the Browns in exchange for wide receiver Bobby Crespino. Originally expected to be a supplement to starting defensive tackles Jim Kanicki and Frank Parker, Modzelewski was rushed into the lineup following an injury to Parker in the season opener on September 13.

Over the course of the season, Modzelewski's veteran leadership helped lead the Browns to their first Eastern Conference title in seven years. In the NFL Championship game on December 27, he joined an aggressive defense in completely shutting down the Baltimore Colts offense, giving the Browns a 27–0 shutout victory.

In his final two years as a player, the Browns again reached the title game in 1965, but fell short the following year. During his final campaign, Modzelewski was joined by another brother, Gene, who played one season before fulfilling a military commitment.

== Coaching career ==
Modzelewski served as a scout for the Browns in 1967, then joined the team's on-field staff the following year as defensive line coach. After two solid years in which the team again reached the NFL Championship game, the Browns' fortunes declined over the next five years, with a then-team-worst 3–11 record in 1975 forcing head coach Forrest Gregg to make changes.

On February 13, 1976, Modzelewski was promoted to defensive coordinator and the team responded with a six-game improvement. Midway through the 1977 season, the Browns had a 5–2 record and seemed destined for their first playoff berth in five years. However, a season-ending injury to starting quarterback Brian Sipe led to a tailspin that culminated with Gregg's dismissal on December 13. Modzelewski was named interim head coach for the team's final game, a 20–19 loss to the second-year Seattle Seahawks.

As 1978 began, new Browns head coach Sam Rutigliano quickly announced he was eliminating the defensive coordinator position, and offered Modzelewski the job of defensive line coach. Seeing the offer as a demotion, Modzelewski resigned and returned to the New York Giants as their defensive coordinator. That position would last only one season after another wholesale coaching change, but he would resurface as defensive line coach with the Cincinnati Bengals in 1979 under head coach Homer Rice.

After first being dismissed with the entire staff one day after the end of the 1979 season, Modzelewski was rehired by Gregg, who had been selected as the Bengals' new head coach. The team struggled to a 6–10 season in 1980, but then put together a memorable year in 1981, ending with the franchise's first-ever trip to the Super Bowl. Despite a 26–21 defeat to the San Francisco 49ers in Super Bowl XVI, the Bengals returned to the postseason the following year, but lost in the first round of the expanded playoff system.

After a disappointing 1983 season, Gregg left to take over his dream job: head coach of the Green Bay Packers, then brought Modzelewski with him to again serve as defensive line coach and defensive coordinator. After four frustrating years, Gregg resigned, and Modzelewski landed with the Lions in 1988 as the defensive line tutor. He spent two years in that role until announcing his retirement.

== Legacy ==
In 1993, Modzelewski was honored for his college football exploits with his induction into the College Football Hall of Fame and in 1986, Dick was inducted into the National Polish American Sports Hall of Fame.

Dick Modzelewski played and started in 8 NFL championship games. 1956, 1958, 1959, 1961–1963 with the New York Giants, and 1964 and 1965 with the Cleveland Browns. He was an NFL Champion twice with the 1956 New York Giants and 1964 Cleveland Browns. He has been a player in more NFL championship games than just about any player in NFL history. Tom Brady has also played and started in 8 title games, all Super Bowls. Hall of Fame Left Tackle and Place Kicker Lou Groza played in 9 NFL Championship games plus 4 AAFC Championship games (All American Football Conference 1946–1949). Lou Groza was back up Offensive lineman in 2 Championship games and a starting Left Tackle for 2 in the AAFC title games. In the NFL, Groza was starting Left Tackle in 7 NFL championship games (1950–1955 & 1957) and Place Kicker in 2 more (1964 & 1965).

== See also ==
- 1952 College Football All-America Team
