= List of tributaries of the Allegheny River =

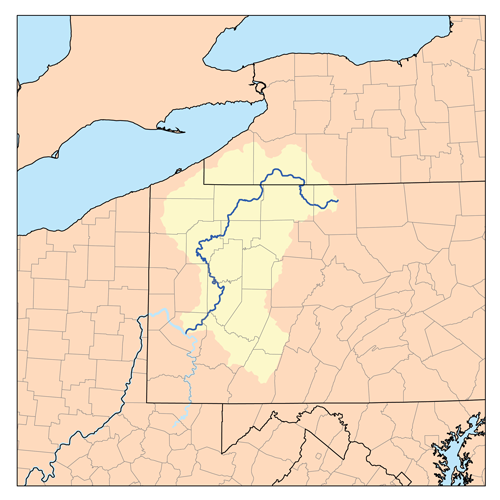
The Allegheny River drainage basin covers parts of New York and Pennsylvania in the United States.

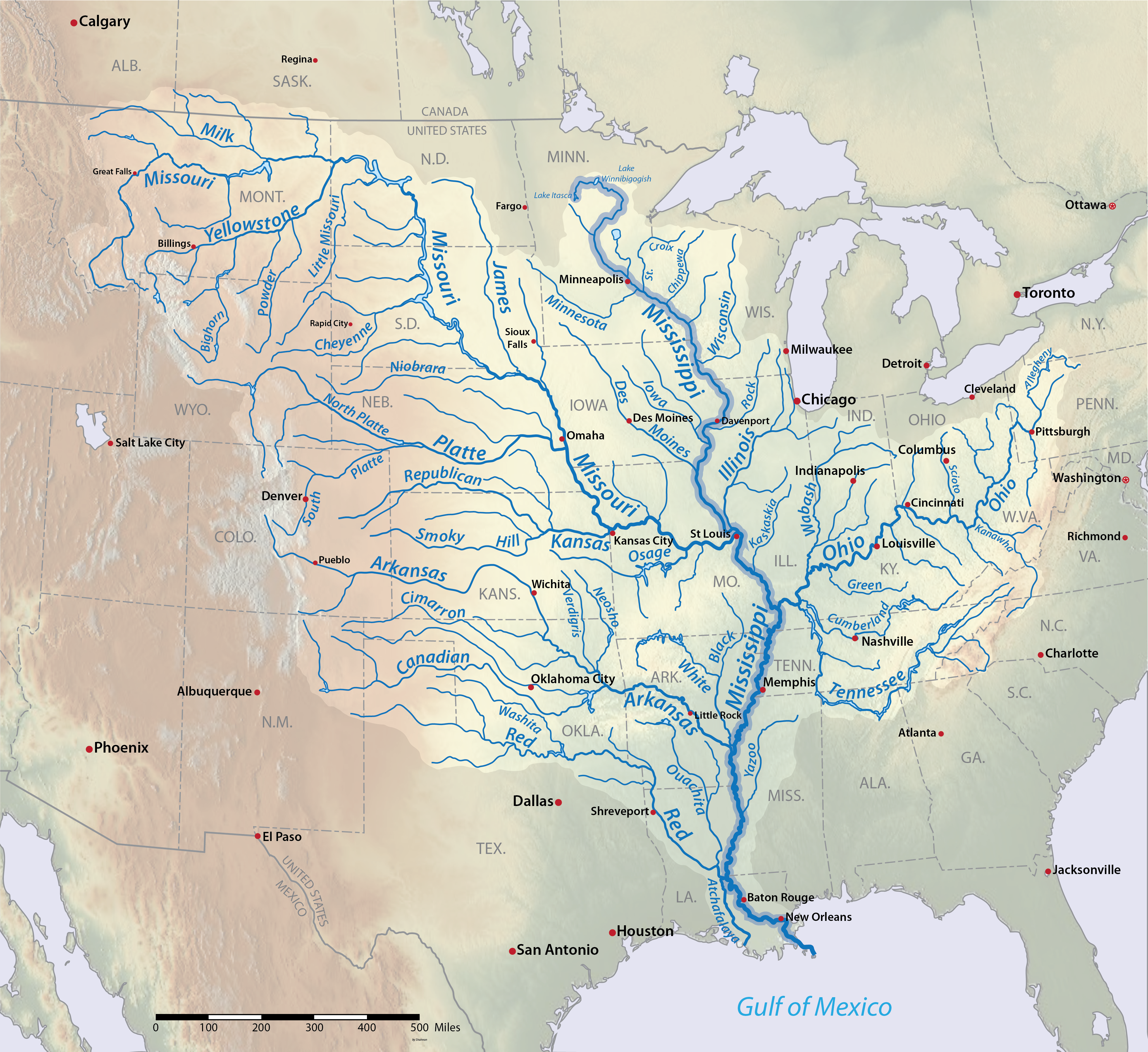
The Allegheny River drainage basin is part of the Mississippi riverine system.

This article contains a list of tributaries of the Allegheny River, a stream in the U.S. states of New York and Pennsylvania. (Mouth at the Ohio River)

New York Sources:

- Oswayo Creek (Portville, Cattaraugus Co., NY)
- Dodge Creek (Allegany County NY)
- Lillibridge Creek (Portville, Cattaraugus Co., NY)
- Wayman Branch (Cattaraugus County NY)
- Haskell Creek (Cattaraugus County NY)
- Kings Brook (Cattaraugus County NY)
- Olean Creek (Olean, Cattaraugus Co., NY)
- Twomile Creek (south bank) (Cattaraugus County NY)
- Twomile Creek (north bank) (Cattaraugus County NY)
- Fourmile Creek (Cattaraugus County NY)
- Fivemile Creek (Allegany, Cattaraugus Co., NY)
- Birch Run (Cattaraugus County NY)
- Ninemile Creek (Cattaraugus County NY)
- Tenmile Creek (Cattaraugus County NY)
- Chipmunk Creek (Cattaraugus County NY) (Elev. 1,371 ft.)
- Tunungwant Creek (Cattaraugus County NY)
- Carrollton Run (Cattaraugus County NY)
- Leonard Run (Cattaraugus County NY)
- Windfall Creek (Cattaraugus County NY)
- Great Valley Creek (Salamanca, Cattaraugus Co., NY)
- Titus Run (Cattaraugus County NY)
- Little Valley Creek (Salamanca, Cattaraugus Co., NY)
- Drakes Run (Cattaraugus County NY)
- Sawmill Run (Cattaraugus County NY)
- Breeds Run (Cattaraugus County NY)
- Red House Lake (Allegany State Park, Cattaraugus County NY)
- Red House Brook (Cattaraugus County NY)
- Robinson Run (Cattaraugus County NY)
- Cricks Run (Cattaraugus County NY)
- Cold Spring Creek (Cattaraugus County NY)

In Pennsylvania ...

- Pine Creek
  - Little Pine Creek (west bank)
  - Little Pine Creek (east bank)
  - Willow Run
  - Montour Run
  - North Fork Pine Creek
    - Crouse Run
  - Wexford Run
- Sycamore Run
  - Stony Camp Run
  - Glade Run
- Plum Creek
  - Bodies Run
  - Little Plum Creek
- Deer Creek
  - Little Deer Creek
  - Long Run
  - Rawlins Run
  - Blue Run
  - Cunningham Run
  - Cedar Run
  - Dawson Run
  - West Branch Deer Creek
- Falling Springs Run
- Blacks Run
- Tawney Run
  - Yutes Run
- Riddle Run
- Pucketa Creek
  - Little Pucketa Creek
- Crawford Run
- Bailey Run
- Days Run
- Girtys Run (Allegheny County, PA)
- Bull Creek
  - Little Bull Creek
  - McDowell Run
  - Lardintown Run
  - Rocky Run
- Chartiers Run
- Rachel Carson Run
- Buffalo Creek
  - Little Buffalo Creek
    - Sarver Run
  - Pine Run
  - Cornplanter Run
  - Sipes Run
  - Rough Run
    - North Branch Rough Run
      - Sarver Run
  - Marrowbone Run
  - Patterson Creek
    - Long Run
  - Little Buffalo Run
- Kiskiminetas River
  - Elder Run
  - Brady Run
  - Guffy Run
  - Carnahan Run
  - Pine Run
  - Beaver Run
  - Roaring Run
    - Rattling Run
  - Flat Run
  - Wolford Run
  - Long Run
  - Blacklegs Creek
    - Big Run
    - Marshall Run
    - Harpers Run
    - Nesbit Run
    - Hooper Run
    - Whisky Run
  - Loyalhanna Creek
    - Getty Run
    - Serviceberry Run
    - Whitethorn Creek
  - Conemaugh River
    - Blacklick Creek
      - Two Lick Creek
        - Yellow Creek
          - Little Yellow Creek
    - Little Conemaugh River
    - Stonycreek River
      - Shade Creek
        - Clear Shade Creek
        - Dark Shade Creek
- Big Run
- Knapp Run
- Hill Run
- Watson Run
- Taylor Run
- Nicholson Run
- Glade Run
- Crooked Creek
  - Campbell Run
  - Elbow Run
  - Horney Camp Run
  - North Branch
    - Cherry Run
  - Fagley Run
  - Sugar Run
  - Lindsay Run
  - Craig Run
  - Plum Creek
    - Dutch Run
    - Cessna Run
    - South Branch
      - Mudlick Run
      - Sugarcamp Run
      - Leisure Run
      - Goose Run
    - North Branch
  - Walker Run
  - Anthony Run
  - Curry Run
    - Cheese Run
  - Mitchell Run
  - Dark Hollow Run
  - Fulton Run
  - McKee Run
  - Twomile Run
  - Pine Run
  - Brush Run
  - Rayne Run
- Garretts Run
  - Rupp Run
- Cowanshannock Creek
  - Mill Run
  - Spra Run
  - Huskins Run
  - South Branch Cowanshannock Creek
  - Spruce Run
- Limestone Run
- Hays Run
- Pine Creek
  - North Fork Pine Creek
    - Bullock Run
  - South Fork Pine Creek
    - Deaver Run
    - Laurel Run
    - North Branch South Fork Pine Creek
    - South Branch South Fork Pine Creek
- Mahoning Creek
  - Little Mahoning Creek
- Redbank Creek
  - Little Sandy Creek
  - North Fork Creek
  - Sandy Lick Creek
- Bear Creek
  - Silver Creek
  - South Branch Bear Creek
  - North Branch Bear Creek
- Clarion River
  - Piney Creek
  - Mill Creek
  - Spring Creek
  - Little Toby Creek
- Sandy Creek
- East Sandy Creek
- French Creek
  - Sugar Creek
  - Conneaut Outlet
  - Cussewago Creek
  - LeBoeuf Creek
    - Trout Run
    - Benson Run
    - East Branch LeBoeuf Creek
  - South Branch French Creek
    - Bentley Run
    - Pine Run
    - Hungry Run
    - Lilley Run
    - Beaver Run
    - Slaughter Run
    - Baskin Run
    - Spencer Creek
- Twomile Run
- Brannon Run
- Charley Run
- Oil Creek
  - Cornplanter Run
    - Calaboose Run
  - Cherry Run
  - Cherrytree Run
    - Wykle Run
    - Kane Run
  - Benninghof Run
  - Husband Run
  - Pine Creek
    - Caldwell Creek
      - Porky Run
      - Stony Hollow Run
  - Church Run
  - Thompson Creek
    - McLaughlin Creek
    - Shirley Run
    - Hummer Creek
  - Marsh Run
  - East Branch Oil Creek
  - Bloomfield Run
  - Mosey Run
  - East Shreve Run
  - West Shreve Run
- Pithole Creek
- Tionesta Creek
- Brokenstraw Creek
  - Coffee Creek
- Conewango Creek
  - Chadakoin River
- Kinzua Creek
- Cornplanter Run
- Oswayo Creek
- Potato Creek
- Mill Creek
- Steer Run
- Baker Creek
- Peet Brook
- Dwight Creek
- Woodcock Creek

== See also ==
- List of rivers of New York
- List of rivers of Pennsylvania
- Tributaries of Redbank Creek

== Sources ==
- Schafer, Jim; Mike Sajna (1992). The Allegheny River: Watershed of the Nation. University Park, Pennsylvania, US: The Pennsylvania State University Press. ISBN 978-0-271-00836-3.
