= Harrison Park =

Harrison Park may refer to:

- Harrison Park (Leek), a stadium in Leek, Staffordshire
- Harrison Park (New Jersey), a former baseball ground in Harrison, New Jersey
- Municipality of Harrison Park, a rural municipality in Manitoba
- Harrison Park, a public park in Edinburgh, Scotland
- Harrison Park (Owen Sound) in Owen Sound, Ontario

== See also ==
- Harrison Hills Park, a county park in Allegheny County, Pennsylvania
