= Clinton Township, Pennsylvania =

Clinton Township is the name of several places in the U.S. state of Pennsylvania:

- Clinton Township, Butler County, Pennsylvania
- Clinton Township, Lycoming County, Pennsylvania
- Clinton Township, Venango County, Pennsylvania
- Clinton Township, Wayne County, Pennsylvania
- Clinton Township, Wyoming County, Pennsylvania
