= Brannon Run =

Brannon Run may refer to:

- Brannon Run (Allegheny River tributary), Venango County, Pennsylvania
- Brannon Run (East Branch Oil Creek tributary), Crawford County, Pennsylvania
