= Pucketa Creek =

Location
- Country: United States

Physical characteristics
- Source
  - coordinates: 40.4767338°N 79.6167107°W
- Mouth
  - coordinates: 40.5503451°N 79.7625479°W
  - elevation: 738 ft (225 m)

Basin features
- River system: Allegheny River
- Tributaries
  - right: Little Pucketa Creek

Pucketa Creek is a tributary of the Allegheny River located in both Allegheny and Westmoreland counties in the U.S. state of Pennsylvania.

== Course ==
Pucketa Creek joins the Allegheny River where the creek forms the boundary between both the city of Lower Burrell and the borough of Plum.

=== Tributaries ===
The Little Pucketa Creek joins Pucketa Creek at Lower Burrell.

== See also ==
- List of rivers of Pennsylvania
- List of tributaries of the Allegheny River
