= Little Pucketa Creek =

Location
- Country: United States

Physical characteristics
- Source
  - coordinates: 40.5583998°N 79.6489346°W
- Mouth
  - coordinates: 40.5506229°N 79.7594923°W
  - elevation: 738 ft (225 m)

Basin features
- River system: Allegheny River

Little Pucketa Creek is a tributary of Pucketa Creek and a sub-tributary of the Allegheny River located in Westmoreland County in the U.S. state of Pennsylvania.

== Course ==
Little Pucketa Creek joins Pucketa Creek at the city of Lower Burrell, approximately 0.2 miles (0.32 km) from the Allegheny River.

== See also ==
- List of rivers of Pennsylvania
- List of tributaries of the Allegheny River
