= Rachel Carson Trail =

Hiking trail in southwestern Pennsylvania

Coordinates: 40.662127°N 79.699203°W

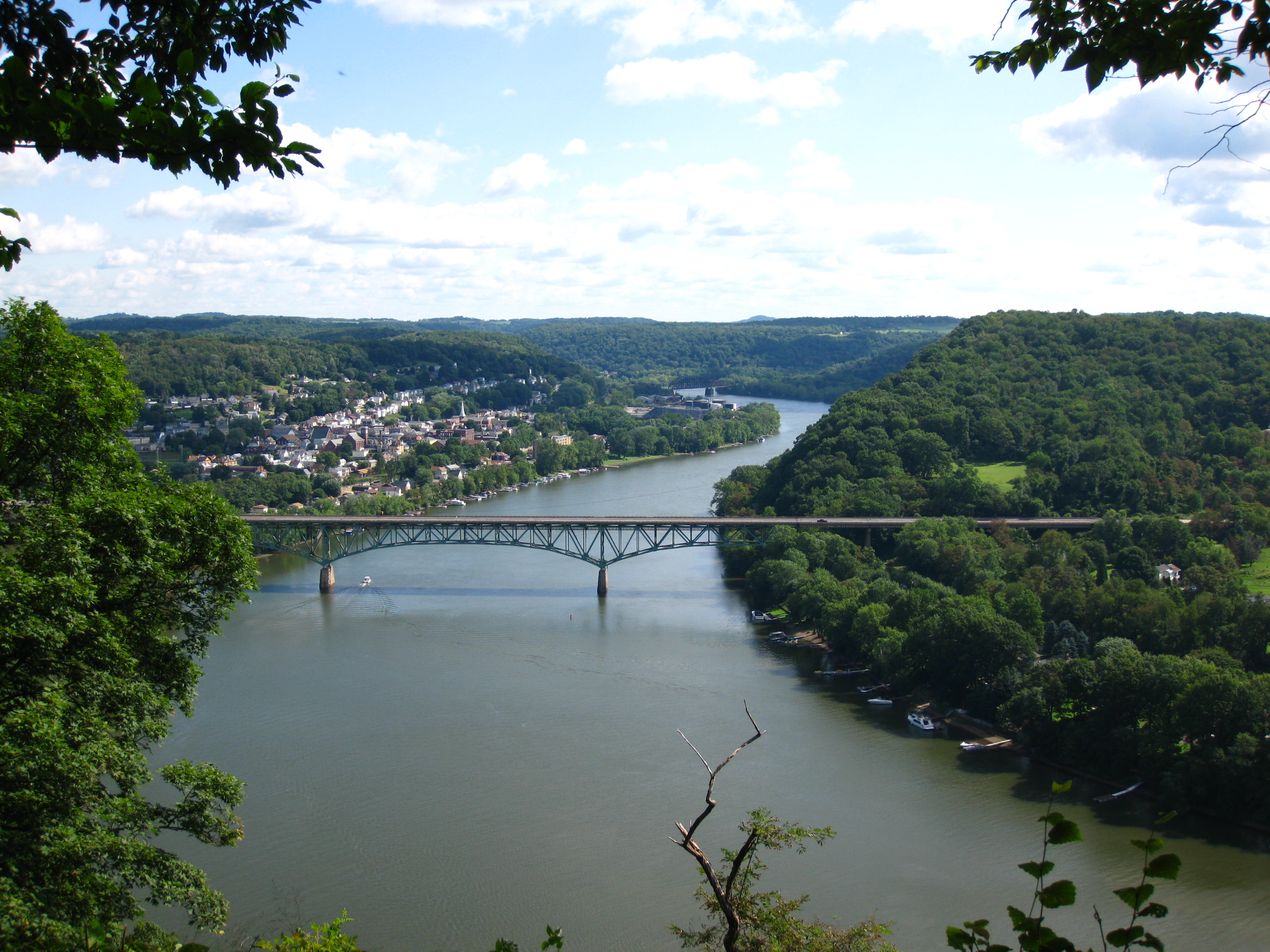
- View of the Freeport Bridge from Rachel Carson Trail
- Length: 45.7 mi (73.5 km)
- Location: Allegheny County, Pennsylvania
- Established: February 1975
- Use: Hiking
- Difficulty: Moderate
- Sights: Streams
- Hazards: Severe weather, hazardous terrain

The Rachel Carson Trail is a 45.7-mile (73.5 km) hiking trail in Allegheny County, Pennsylvania, United States. Its western terminus is in the suburban North Park district in the Pittsburgh metropolitan area, and its eastern terminus is in Harrison Hills Park along the Allegheny River, near the town of Freeport. The trail is maintained by the Rachel Carson Trails Conservancy.

== History and route ==
The Rachel Carson Trail was built by volunteers beginning in 1972 and was christened in 1975. It was named after the influential conservationist, who was born and raised in the area. Most of the trail follows gravel park paths and rights-of-way for power lines or pipelines, though some of the terrain is very rugged, and there are several significant climbs and bridgeless stream crossings. Most of the route is on private land, on which passage for hikers has been arranged with owners. Due to occasional changes in land ownership, the route of the trail may change with little notice, so hikers are advised to have the most up-to-date information.

Hiking from west to east, the trail traverses North Park and Hampton Community Park. East of that park, a spur trail heads south to Hartwood Acres Park. Back on the Rachel Carson Trail, the hiker briefly follows PA Route 910 and uses that road to cross the Pennsylvania Turnpike near Dorseyville. Continuing to the east, the trail passes through Emmerling Park, and continues to the town of Harwick, where it uses a local street to pass under the PA Route 28 expressway. The trail then walks through the town of Springdale on local streets, and passes the Rachel Carson Homestead on Marion Avenue. After exiting Springdale, the trail turns generally to the north, first through Agan Park and mostly parallel to the Allegheny River.

In this area, the Rachel Carson Trail follows a former segment of the Baker Trail, which had been cut off from the rest of that trail by development. Near Creighton, the trail again crosses the PA Route 28 expressway via a local street, and continues to the northeast and parallel to the highway for the next several miles. The trail passes below the expressway via a local street for a third time, and heads east toward Harrison Hills Park, following a circuitous route through that park and ending near the corner of Freeport Road and Bakerstown Road.

Every year since 1996, the Rachel Carson Trails Conservancy has hosted the Rachel Carson Trail Challenge. Participants attempt a 37-mile long, one-day, sunrise to sunset endurance hike along the trail. The stated challenge is simply to finish the entire stretch before sunset, after approximately 15 hours. Two shorter challenge routes of 18 miles and 8 miles are offered as well. The trail has also been part of the 100 Mile Quest, a challenge to hike 100 miles on the region's trails in one year.
