= Robert W. Olszewski =

American painter and miniatures artist

Robert "Bob" Olszewski
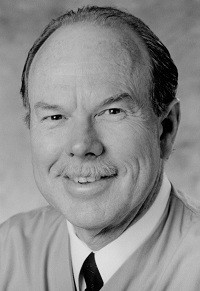
- Olszewski in January 2009
- Born: Robert William Olszewski; May 2, 1945 (age 80); Natrona Heights, Pennsylvania, U.S.
- Education: Indiana University of Pennsylvania
- Known for: Miniature Figurative Artist
- Notable work: Goebel Miniatures; Norman Rockwell; Bialosky; Artists of the World; Danbury Mint; Franklin Mint; Grolier Enterprises; Olszewski Studios; Harmony Ball; IUP Alumni Association; Disney; Enesco
- Movement: Pop Culture
- Awards: International Collectible Artist of the Year 1993; Distinguished (IUP) Alumni of the Year Award 1998
- Website: www.olszewskistudios.com

Robert William Olszewski (pronounced ol-shes-ski) (born May 2, 1945) is a painter and miniatures artist who has worked with Disney, Enesco, and other companies.

== Early life and education ==
Olszewski was born on May 2, 1945, in Natrona Heights, Pennsylvania, to William and Anna Ajak Olszewski. He is the second of two sons. His father, William Vance Olszewski, a steel worker, died of a heart attack at the age of 43 in 1955 when Robert Olszewski was nine-years-old.

Olszewski's interest in painting began at an early age and he won several local awards for his work during high school. After graduating from Har-Brack High School in 1963, he attended Indiana University of Pennsylvania (IUP), where he worked in steel mills and helped build railroad cars to pay for tuition and showed his paintings in local and Pittsburgh-area art galleries. In 1968, he graduated with a Bachelor of Science in art education.

Olszewski married Linda Liedtke following his graduation, and they moved to Camarillo, California. Olszewski taught art at a junior high school while continuing to pursue painting as a career. He painted almost daily, shipping his works to galleries and exhibitions. The couple subsequently divorced.

== Career ==
=== Early Miniaturization ===
In 1972, one of Olszewski's paintings was stolen from an exhibition in Las Vegas. When the police asked Robert to provide a photograph of the original painting, he reproduced it from memory as a 3" x 3" miniature and mailed the reproduction to the police. This event prompted Robert to use miniaturization as a teaching tool in his art classroom.

In 1975, Olszewski began his first miniatures project–a dollhouse for his two-year-old daughter in 1:12 scale. After a neighbor expressed interest in the dollhouse, Robert copied this design and eventually sold three more dollhouses.

After speaking with a dentist friend about carving teeth out of wax, Olszewski realized he could use the same method for figurines. In 1977, Olszewski carved his first in-scale miniature figurine to place on one of the dollhouse's bookcases. Thus, he began using the "lost wax" casting method, which involves carving a piece of wax, casting it, and creating a mold. Using a nail, a screwdriver, and his wax casting method, Robert created "Lady with an Urn," his first professional figurine.

Using the lost wax method, Olszewski was able to reproduce his original figurines and sell them at miniature shows and conventions. Within a year, he became popular and profitable enough to leave his teaching job in 1978 to become a full-time artist. He set up a "studio" in his bedroom closet to carve and paint cast bronze miniatures. Here, Robert created and produced himself 14 different figurines and about 4,000 hand-painted replicas from 1977 to 1978.

=== Goebel Miniatures ===
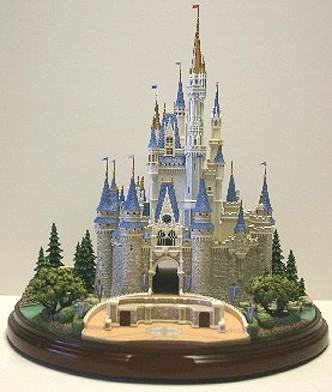
Olszewski's Cinderella's Castle, a 12" high x 11.5" wide x 11" deep sculpture that is part of Walt Disney World in Orlando, Florida

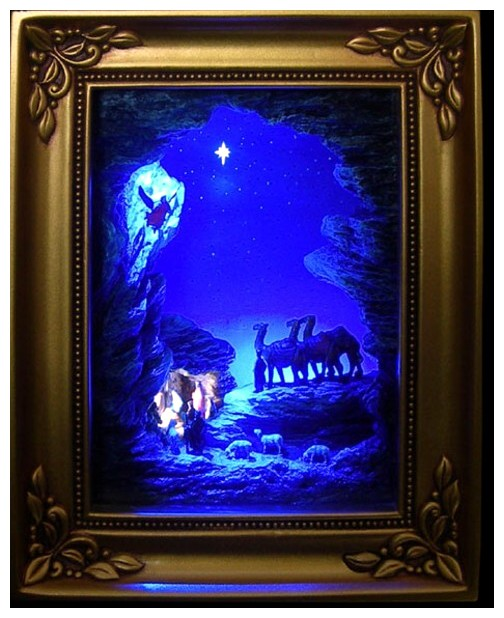
Olszewski's The Nativity from the Gallery of Light Collection, measuring 4 3/4" w x 6 1/16" h x 3 13/16" deep

Olszewski's best-selling early miniatures were his reproductions of Goebel's Hummels and Royal Doulton figurines. He produced miniature replicas of the following Hummel figurines in gold: “Barnyard Here,” “Stormy Weather,” “Kiss Me,” “Ring Around the Rosie,” and “Ride into Christmas.” He also created gold bracelet charms with the above miniatures. Today, these unauthorized Goebel figurines and bracelets command very high prices in collector markets.

After another artist warned him that he might be violating a trademark, Robert wrote to both companies to explain his work and ask if they wanted him to stop producing their figurines in miniature form. In reply, he received a contract from Royal Doulton licensing him to reproduce their figurines in miniature form. From Goebel, he received a request to see his "factory."

Goebel's North American representatives met with Olszewski at his home in Camarillo, California, in 1979. Dick Hunt, author of The Goebel Miniatures of Robert Olszewski, described the meeting as follows:

So [Olszewski escorted the executives] off into his bedroom and ‘the closet.’ Bob pointed out his carving department (the top of the work area), his research department (four books on the upper shelf), and the storage area for his supply of wax and bronze (top drawer of the dresser). His paints and the brushes in the second drawer made up the painting department, while the bottom drawer contained the warehouse, shipping, and receiving departments. Truly a miniature operation!

In July 1979, Goebel offered Olszewski a contract as "Master Artist." The result was Goebel Miniatures Studios, founded in Camarillo, California with Olszewski in charge of design, production, and quality control.

Goebel Miniatures moved out of Robert's bedroom closet and into a building in downtown Camarillo. From 1980 to 1994, Olszewski trained sculptors and artists for Goebel Miniatures, and worked with them to create miniature, bronze figurines, and environmental displays. As the master artist, Olszewski produced the master design for each figurine by carving the original wax design for use in the lost wax process to produce a bronze figurine. Next, each piece was hand-painted by Olszewski and given to the Studios’ artisans to reproduce from his original. Olszewski inspected all figurines produced by the other Goebel Miniatures artists before shipment. All of the figurative art Olszewski produced for Goebel Miniatures was cast in bronze and individually hand-painted. The displays were cast in resin.

Olszewski went from creating unauthorized Hummel figurines to overseeing the only studio outside of Bavaria that was authorized to produce M.I. Hummel figurines. Of note is the Kinder Way collection, a collection of Bavarian buildings and settings to accompany the M.I. Hummel miniatures. Goebel Miniatures produced 26 different scaled down M.I. Hummel figurines before the series was suspended in 1992, with special editions produced at later dates. The five Kinder Way buildings and displays are "Market Square Flower Stand," “Countryside School," “Wayside Shrine," “Bavarian Cottage," and "Bavarian Village."

In 1985, Grolier commissioned Goebel Miniatures to produce the Walt Disney Snow White and Seven Dwarfs Collection to celebrate the 50th anniversary of the animated film. This collection consisted of eight individual figurine pieces, cast in bronze and hand-painted. The collection met with success, and Goebel secured its own license for reproducing Walt Disney characters in miniature. While at Goebel Miniatures, Olszewski created figurines of the characters and environmental displays for Disney films, including Snow White and the Seven Dwarfs, Peter Pan, Pinocchio, Cinderella, and Fantasia. These figurines were sold under the name "Marquee Classics."

In 1991, the collector-based Olszewski Study Group (OSG) planned the first and only National Olszewski Convention, which was held in Toledo, Ohio. Over the three-day event, Olszewski gave several presentations to the 246 attendees describing his life and his art. Author Dick Hunt, Goebel executive Paul Schmid, and Olszewski's brother, Ray, also gave speeches at the event.

During his time with Goebel Miniatures, Olszewski traveled extensively and gave lectures to collectors at hundreds of retail gift stores and conventions where he made a special appearance to meet collectors and sign his art. In 1993, Olszewski was named the International Collectible Artist of the Year by the Gifts and Collectibles Industry. That same year, a 30-year retrospective of his work was showcased at the Carnegie Art Museum in Oxnard, California.

In addition to the M.I. Hummel series and Marquee Classics, Olszewski created his own miniatures, produced by Goebel, including a series inspired by the stories he read to his children called Storybook Lane. Other collections include, DeGrazia, American Frontier, and The Saturday Evening Post by Norman Rockwell.

From 1980 to the time Olszewski left Goebel in 1994, he created and oversaw the production of a total of 360 figurines and displays.

In 1994, Robert Olszewski nearly lost his life to colon cancer and left Goebel as the lead designer of Goebel Miniatures to recuperate, and changed his business direction by establishing his own Olszewski Studios. In 1998, he secured his own contract with Disney to work with them on the Story Time line, which captures nine Disney films in miniature form and was distributed from 2000 through 2006. The films include The Nightmare Before Christmas and Alice in Wonderland. In 1998, he was commissioned to create miniatures for the premiere of the film, A Bug’s Life and the cast of Steamboat Willie.

The piece from A Bug's Life had a top piece that lifted off to reveal a small box. Using this idea, Olszewski created a jewelry box line called The Renaissance Collection during 1997 and 1998. This series included jewelry and decorative boxes featuring Disney characters as well as Olszewski's original art.

After the Disney pieces caught the eye of Disney executives, Olszewski was commissioned to create a miniature village centered on Disneyland's Main Street, U.S.A. The Main Street Collection began with Sleeping Beauty's Castle and 10 years later, eventually included almost every building and theme park ride in Disneyland, along with landscaping pieces. Six years later, Olszewski added Disney World's theme park to the miniaturization project, including buildings, structures, lighting, characters, and vehicles. The buildings in both collections are in "Z”scale (1/220), with the vehicles and characters in 1:160th scale. In 2011 at Disney's D23 2011 Expo held at the Anaheim Convention Center, Olszewski premiered the third miniaturization project that will create Disney's Fantasyland in miniature, also in "Z” scale.

In 2007, Olszewski began the Gallery of Light® Collection, which presents scenes from Disney films in a 3-dimensional framed box, with LED lights that turn on and off to illuminate the scene. The first piece in this collection pictured the "Jail Scene" from the Pirates of the Caribbean attraction at Disneyland. The Gallery of Light Collection has expanded to include other works beyond the Disney scenes. In 2008, Olszewski was commissioned by Enesco to create Gallery of Light pieces featuring the art of Walt Disney, painter Thomas Kinkade, Norman Rockwell art, images of Elvis, Leonardo da Vinci's "The Last Supper," and Olszewski's own "Nativity" series.

Additional Olszewski Studio lines include PokitPals and Heirloom Boxes. These projects continue to date in Camarillo, California.

=== Influences ===
Traveling on behalf of Goebel gave Olszewski the opportunity to visit art museums in order to learn from the best artists of the world. Olszewski notes that in the past 40 years, he has studied art displayed in over 40 museums . He noted the different types of "miniature" art, rarely described as such, in jewelry, prayer book illuminations, scrimshaw, buttons, netsuke carvings, and portraits. A list of those museums he visited can be found in a Disney interview.

Olszewski states that his artistic influences are Thomas Hart Benton, Charles Burchfield, Edward Hopper, René Lalique, Vincent van Gogh, Peter Brugel, Thomas Eakins, Claude Monet, N.C. Wyeth, Pablo Picasso, Rembrandt, the Limbourg Brothers, Berta Hummel, Carl Faberge, Norman Rockwell, and the art of the Walt Disney Company.

== Museums ==
Museums featuring Olszewski's art include:

- Allegheny Kiski Valley Historical Museum, permanent display
- Carnegie Art Museum, displayed from December 19, 1992 – March 28, 1993
- The Carole and Barry Kaye Museum of Miniatures, displayed from October 12, 1996 – April 26, 1997
- The Indiana University of Pennsylvania (IUP) Art Museum, March 28, 1998 – May 17, 1998
- Naples Museum of Art, The Pistner House
- Dollhouse Museum of the Southwest in Dallas, TX

== Honors ==
- Included in a miniature art display in the White House, Washington D.C. in 1982
- Gift and Collectibles Industry "Miniature of the Year" award in 1985 and 1992
- Gift and Collectible Industry "International Collectible Artist of the Year" award in 1993
