= McDowell Run (Bull Creek tributary) =

Location
- Country: United States

Physical characteristics
- Source
  - coordinates: 40.685°N 79.7688889°W
- Mouth
  - coordinates: 40.6378440°N 79.7728276°W
  - elevation: 814 ft (248 m)

Basin features
- River system: Allegheny River

McDowell Run is a tributary of Bull Creek in Allegheny and Butler counties in the U.S. state of Pennsylvania.

== Course ==
McDowell Run joins Bull Creek near the intersection of Bull Creek and Howes Run roads in Fawn Township.

== See also ==
- List of rivers of Pennsylvania
- List of tributaries of the Allegheny River
