= Rachel Carson Run =

Location
- Country: United States

Physical characteristics
- Source
  - coordinates: 40°39′32″N 79°42′15″W
- Mouth
  - coordinates: 40°38′56″N 79°41′28″W
  - elevation: 748 ft (228 m)
- Length: 1.4 mi (2.3 km)

Basin features
- River system: Allegheny River

Rachel Carson Run is a 1.4-mile (2.3 km) long tributary of the Allegheny River located in Allegheny County in the U.S. state of Pennsylvania.

Rachel Carson Run flows through Harrison Hills Park and joins the Allegheny River within Harrison Township.

The stream is named after ecologist Rachel Carson.

== See also ==
- List of rivers of Pennsylvania
- List of tributaries of the Allegheny River
