= Sycamore Run (Allegheny River tributary) =

Location
- Country: United States

Physical characteristics
- Source
  - coordinates: 40.5553455°N 79.8853295°W
- Mouth
  - coordinates: 40.4845129°N 79.8772723°W
  - elevation: 725 ft (221 m)

Basin features
- River system: Allegheny River

Sycamore Run (formerly Squaw Run) is a tributary of the Allegheny River located in Allegheny County in the U.S. state of Pennsylvania. The name was changed to Sycamore Run on September 8, 2022.

== Course ==
Sycamore Run joins the Allegheny River at the township of O'Hara.

=== Tributaries ===
(Mouth at the Allegheny River)

- Stony Camp Run
- Glade Run

== See also ==
- List of rivers of Pennsylvania
- List of tributaries of the Allegheny River
