= Rocky Run (Bull Creek tributary) =

Location
- Country: United States

Physical characteristics
- Source
  - coordinates: 40.7227778°N 79.8625°W
- Mouth
  - coordinates: 40.6745103°N 79.8281078°W
  - elevation: 922 ft (281 m)

Basin features
- River system: Allegheny River

Rocky Run is a tributary of Bull Creek in Butler County in the U.S. state of Pennsylvania.

== Course ==
The entire course of Rocky Run is within Clinton Township. It rises just east of Sandy Hill Road along Glade Mill Road (part of PA Route 228). The stream generally flows in a southeastern direction towards Allegheny County. Rocky Run then empties into Bull Creek near Saxonburg Boulevard's intersection with Cherry Valley Road.

== See also ==
- List of rivers of Pennsylvania
- List of tributaries of the Allegheny River
