= Bull Creek (Allegheny River tributary) =

Location
- Country: United States

Physical characteristics
- Source
  - coordinates: 40.6945103°N 79.8953328°W
- Mouth
  - coordinates: 40.5975667°N 79.7600487°W
  - elevation: 755 ft (230 m)

Basin features
- River system: Allegheny River

Bull Creek is a tributary of the Allegheny River in Allegheny and Butler counties, Pennsylvania in the United States.

== Course ==
Bull Creek joins the Allegheny River at the borough of Tarentum.

=== Tributaries ===
(Mouth at the Allegheny River)

- Little Bull Creek joins Bull Creek via a culvert underneath Bull Creek Road (Pennsylvania Route 366) at Tarentum.
- McDowell Run joins Bull Creek near the intersection of Bull Creek Road and Howes Run Road in Fawn Township.
- Lardintown Run joins Bull Creek near the intersection of Bull Creek Road and Lardintown Road in Fawn Township.
- Rocky Run joins Bull Creek near the intersection of Saxonburg Boulevard and Cherry Valley Road in Clinton Township.

== See also ==
- List of rivers of Pennsylvania
- List of tributaries of the Allegheny River
