= Rachel Carson Homestead =

Historic house in Pennsylvania, United States

- U.S. National Register of Historic Places
- Pittsburgh Landmark – PHLF
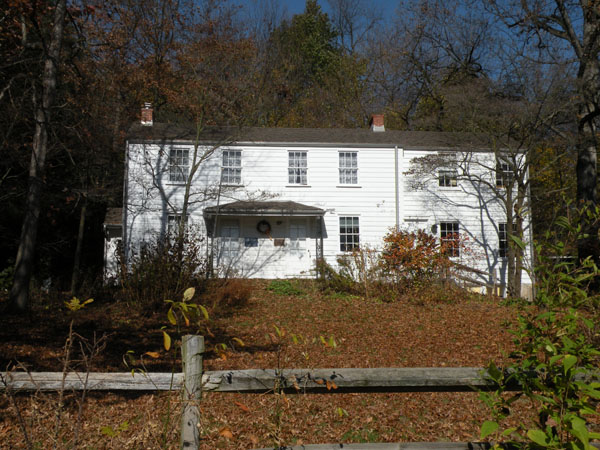

- Location within Pennsylvania Location within the United States
- Location: 613 Marion Avenue, Springdale, Pennsylvania
- Coordinates: 40°32′47.15″N 79°47′0.07″W
- Built: 1870
- NRHP reference No.: 76001601

Significant dates
- Added to NRHP: October 22, 1976
- Designated PHLF: 1975

The Rachel Carson Homestead is the birthplace and childhood home of biologist, writer, and conservationist Rachel Carson. It is located in Springdale, Pennsylvania, United States, eighteen miles northeast of Pittsburgh and near the Allegheny River. The Rachel Carson Homestead was designated a Historic Landmark by the Pittsburgh History and Landmarks Foundation in 1975, and listed on the National Register of Historic Places in 1976.

== History ==
The Carson family moved to this four-room farmhouse in 1901 with plans to live in the home temporarily, and to sell lots from the 65-acre land to finance building a modern home. Rachel was born here in 1907.

The house underwent few improvements during the Carson residence, as financial difficulties prevented the family from accomplishing their plan. Carson and her family remained in this home until she completed her studies at the Pennsylvania College for Women (now Chatham University) in 1929. She continued her studies in Baltimore at Johns Hopkins University. Her family soon followed her to Baltimore.

The house was sold to a local high school English teacher who updated utilities and added rooms, extending the footprint of the original home. The original four rooms used by the Carsons remain substantially unchanged. The grounds are reduced to a little more than a half-acre, but a small hiking trail accesses adjoining municipal property. A springhouse, still standing, was the source of water for the Carsons.

In 1975, the homestead was acquired by the Rachel Carson Homestead Association, Inc. (RCHA) for restoration and preservation.

The homestead is a landmark on the Rachel Carson Trail, a 46.2 mi (74.4 km) trail managed by the Rachel Carson Trails Conservancy. The trail is known for its annual Rachel Carson Trail Challenge, a 36 mi (57.9 km) one-day endurance hike which passes by the homestead.

Rachel Carson wrote her influential 1962 book Silent Spring at Rachel Carson House in Colesville, Maryland.

== Rachel Carson Homestead Association ==
The RCHA, a nonprofit organization, maintains the Rachel Carson Homestead and welcomes visitors to tours and events. The mission of the Rachel Carson Homestead Association is to preserve, restore, and interpret Rachel Carson's birthplace; to design and implement environmental education programs; and to educate the community, guided by her environmental ethics and sense of wonder.

The RCHA established the Rachel Carson Legacy Challenge, which challenges individuals, government, industry and institutions to lessen their ecological footprint. The challenge uses Carson's environmental ethic as the benchmark for permanent and measurable change.

== See also ==
- Rachel Carson House (Colesville, Maryland), her home in later life
- Rachel Carson Bridge
- Rachel Carson Trail

== Sources ==
- Kidney, Walter C. (1997). Pittsburgh's Landmark Architecture: The Historic Buildings of Pittsburgh and Allegheny County. Pittsburgh: Pittsburgh History & Landmarks Foundation. ISBN 0-916670-18-X.
