= Harrison Hills Park =

County park in Allegheny County, Pennsylvania

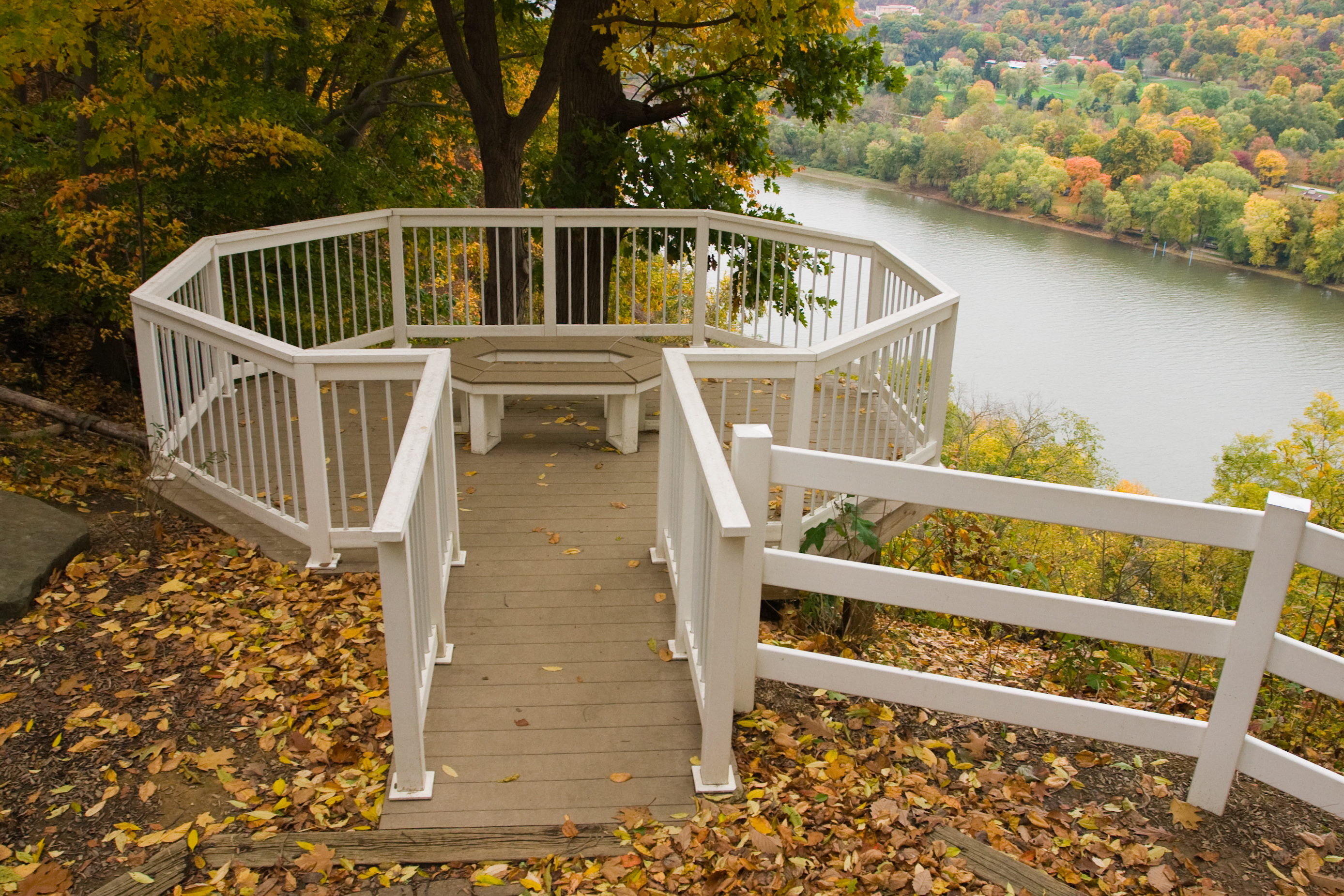
- The Harrison Hills Park overlook of the Allegheny River and Allegheny Township in Autumn 2007

- Location within Pennsylvania Location within the United States
- Type: Municipal
- Location: Allegheny County, Pennsylvania
- Coordinates: 40.6492325°N 79.6989370°W
- Area: 500-acre (2.0 km^{2})

Harrison Hills Park is a 500-acre (2.0 km^{2}) county park in Allegheny County, Pennsylvania, in the United States. It is a part of the county's 12,000-acre (49 km^{2}) network of nine distinct parks.

It is situated 24 miles (39 km) northeast of Pittsburgh in Harrison Township. The park features an overlook of the Allegheny River and offers walking, hiking, and bridle trails. The Harrison Hills Park Environmental Learning Center is open on weekends.

== Trails ==
The eastern trailhead of the 35.7-mile (57.5 km) Rachel Carson Trail is just north of the park's entrance. The trail traverses the park's eastern perimeter along the edge of a bluff overlooking the Allegheny River. It crosses Rachel Carson Run, via a wooden arch bridge above Rachel Carson Falls, which meanders below the Ox Roast grove.

In early 2016 a North American beaver (Castor canadensis) took up residence in South Pound in the park, and appears to be removing non-native Russian olive trees, freeing up room for fishermen on the shore.
