= Lardintown Run =

Location
- Country: United States

Physical characteristics
- Source
  - coordinates: 40.7244444°N 79.8305556°W
- Mouth
  - coordinates: 40.6486772°N 79.7892171°W
  - elevation: 830 ft (250 m)

Basin features
- River system: Allegheny River

Lardintown Run is a tributary of Bull Creek and a sub-tributary of the Allegheny River located in both Allegheny and Butler counties in the U.S. state of Pennsylvania.

== Course ==
Lardintown Run joins Bull Creek near the intersection of Bull Creek Road and Lardintown Road in Fawn Township.

== See also ==
- List of rivers of Pennsylvania
- List of tributaries of the Allegheny River
