= Rachel Carson House (Colesville, Maryland) =

Historic house in Maryland, United States

- U.S. National Register of Historic Places
- U.S. National Historic Landmark
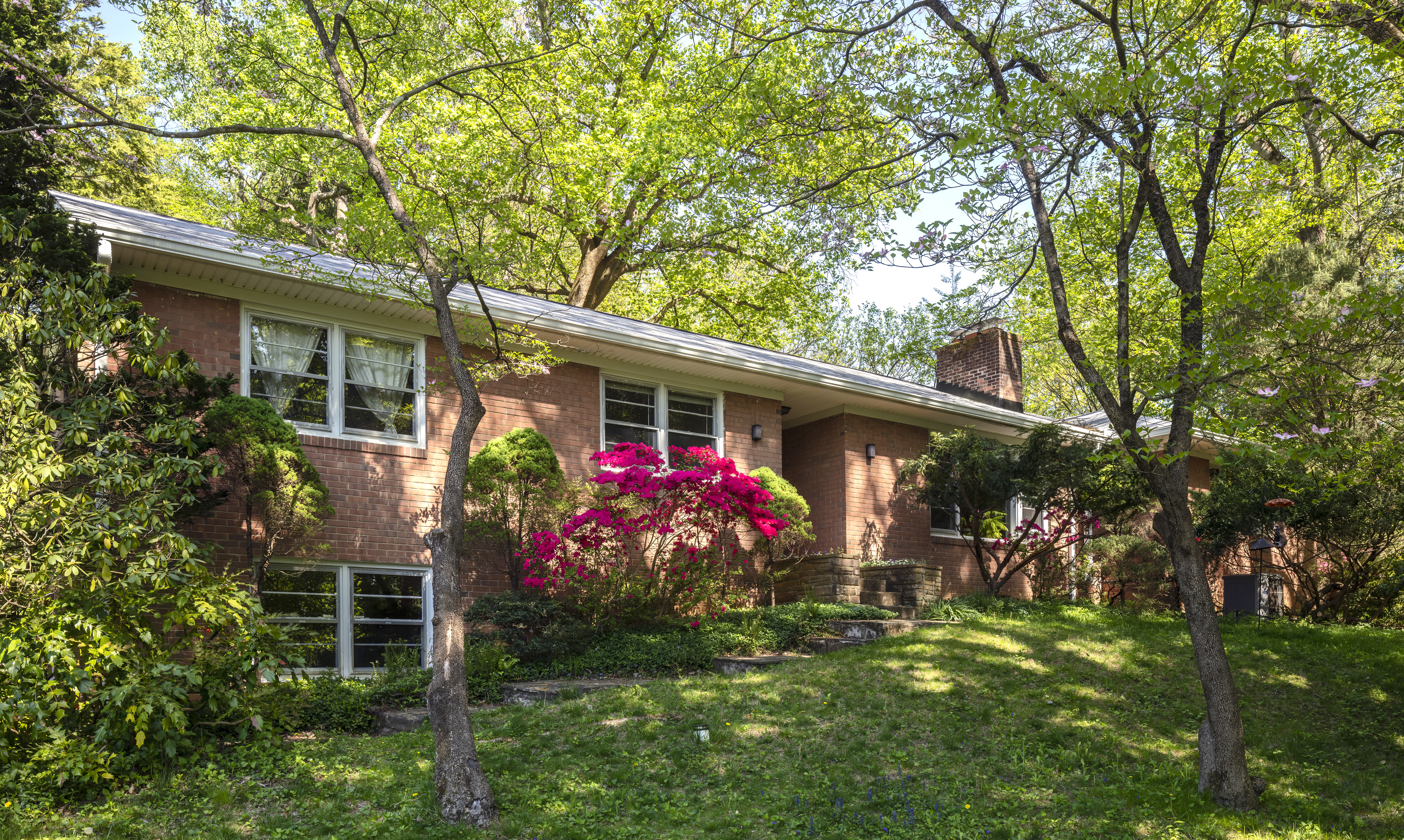
- Rachel Carson House in 2023

- Location within Maryland Location within the United States
- Location: 11701 Berwick Rd., Silver Spring, Maryland
- Coordinates: 39°2′48″N 77°0′2″W
- Built: 1956
- Architect: Rachel Carson
- Architectural style: Modern Movement
- NRHP reference No.: 91002058

Significant dates
- Added to NRHP: December 4, 1991
- Designated NHL: December 4, 1991

The Rachel Carson House is a historic house in Colesville, Maryland, an unincorporated area near Silver Spring, Maryland. Built in 1956, this typical suburban ranch-style house was where writer Rachel Carson wrote her classic work Silent Spring in 1962. The house was designated a National Historic Landmark in 1991 for its association with Carson.

== Description ==
The one-story house is typical of its era, finished in brick with an asphalt shingle roof. The interior, virtually unchanged since Carson lived there, contains a living room to the right of the entry, with Carson's study to one side, on the corner of the house. A kitchen and dining room are at the rear, behind the living room. Bedrooms are to the left of the entry. A basement contains a bedroom and bathroom and a multi-purpose room, as well as unfinished space.

Carson's original landscaping is largely intact, with only a small area of lawn. The wooded landscape of evergreens, azaleas and daffodils is in keeping with her desire to keep a "woody section" of the yard.

== History ==
Designed by Carson and built for her use, the new home provided "all the special things that I need." She began writing Silent Spring at the house in 1958, rarely using the Maine cottage where she wrote The Edge of the Sea published in 1955. As Carson continued work on the book, the nature of the research, involving public documents and correspondence with scholars, and her own health encouraged her to spend more and more of her time at home in Silver Spring. After the publication of Silent Spring in 1962, Carson spent most of the next two years in Silver Spring before her death on April 14, 1964. Prior to her residence at this house, Carson lived in other houses in Montgomery County, including in the Woodmoor neighborhood of Silver Spring, where she wrote the National Book Award winning The Sea Around Us

== See also ==
- Rachel Carson Homestead, her birthplace and childhood home in Springdale, Pennsylvania
- List of National Historic Landmarks in Maryland
- National Register of Historic Places listings in Montgomery County, Maryland
