= Burtner House =

Historic house in Pennsylvania, United States

- U.S. National Register of Historic Places
- Pittsburgh Landmark – PHLF
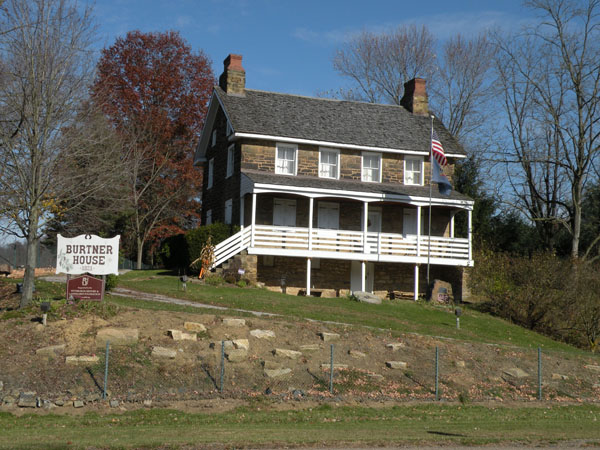

- Location within Pennsylvania Location within the United States
- Location: Burtner Road near Pennsylvania Route 28, Harrison Township, Allegheny County, Pennsylvania, United States
- Coordinates: 40°37′52.93″N 79°43′50.95″W
- Built: 1818 – 1821
- Architect: Phillip Burtner
- NRHP reference No.: 72001088

Significant dates
- Added to NRHP: January 13, 1972
- Designated PHLF: 1975

The Burtner House (also known as the Burtner Stone House) is an historic home which is located on Burtner Road in Harrison Township, Allegheny County, Pennsylvania in the United States.

It was added to the National Register of Historic Places in 1972.

== History and architectural features ==
Built between 1818 and 1821 by Phillip Burtner, along Little Bull Creek, the property was originally a working farm and residence of the Burtner family. Through the years, it served as an election polling station and as the setting for town meetings, including the discussions that lead to the construction of the Pennsylvania Canal. The house served four generations of the Burtner family.

Spared from demolition prior to the construction of Pennsylvania Route 28, the Burtner House was added to the National Register of Historic Places in 1972, and to the List of Pittsburgh History and Landmarks Foundation Historic Landmarks in 1975.

The site is home to an annual strawberry festival the third Saturday in June.
