= Tarentum, Pennsylvania =

Borough in Pennsylvania, US

- Borough
- Borough of Tarentum
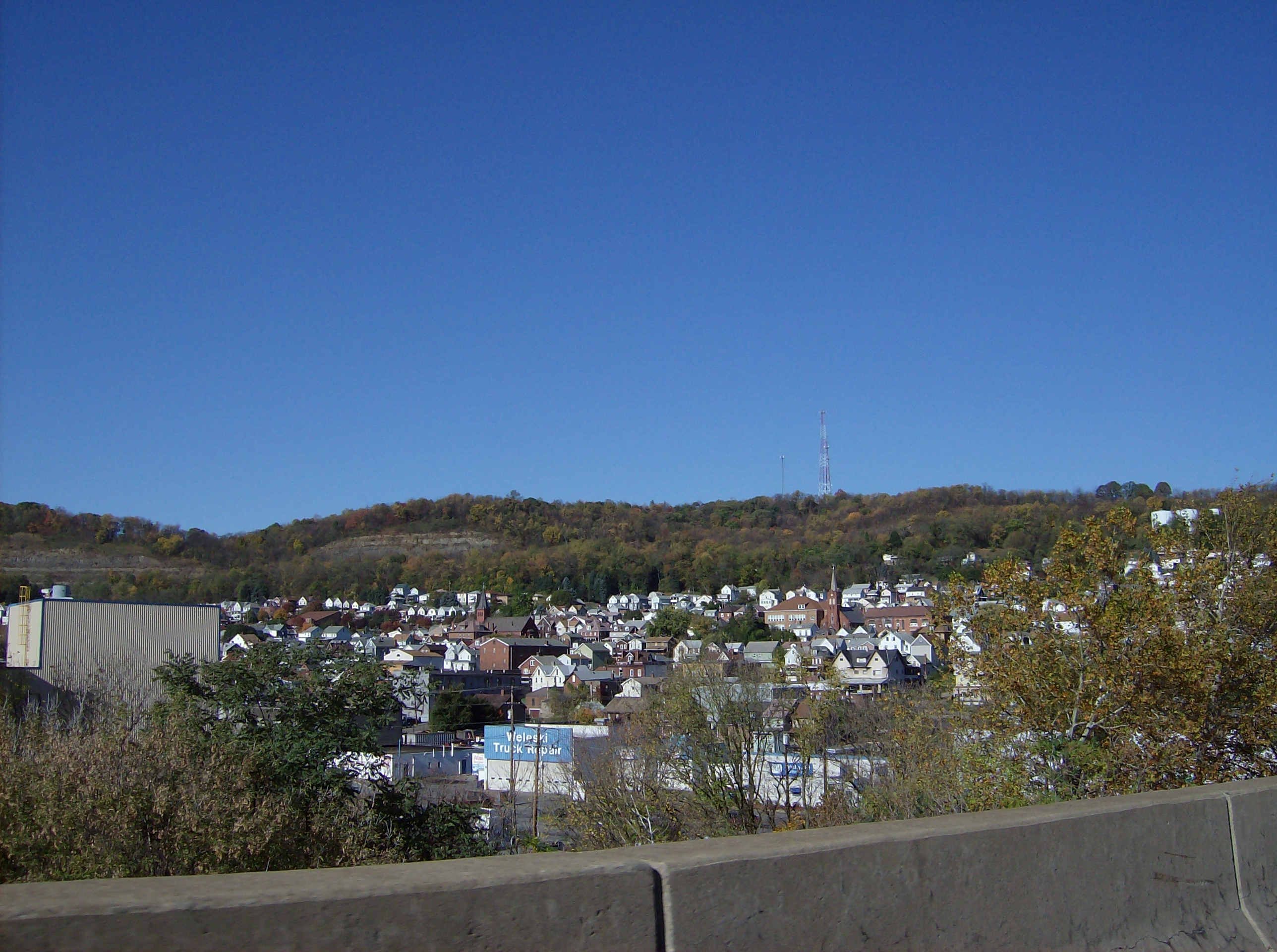
- Tarentum as seen from the George D. Stuart Bridge, part of Pennsylvania Route 366
- Motto: The Crossroads of the Allegheny Valley
- Location in Allegheny County and the U.S. state of Pennsylvania.

- Location of Pennsylvania in the United States
- Coordinates: 40°36′11″N 79°45′20″W
- Country: United States
- State: Pennsylvania
- County: Allegheny
- Incorporated: March 7, 1842
- Founder: Henry Brackenridge

Government
  - Type: Council-manager government
  - Body: Tarentum Borough Council
  - President: Scott Dadowski (D)

Area
  - Total: 1.38 sq mi (3.58 km^{2})
  - Land: 1.23 sq mi (3.19 km^{2})
  - Water: 0.15 sq mi (0.39 km^{2})
- Elevation: 840 ft (260 m)

Population (2020)
  - Total: 4,352
  - Density: 3,538.2/sq mi (1,366.09/km^{2})
- Time zone: UTC-5 (EST)
  - Summer (DST): UTC-4 (EDT)
- ZIP code: 15084
- Area codes: 724, 878
- FIPS code: 42-76104
- School district: Highlands
- Website: www.tarentumboro.com

Tarentum is a borough in Allegheny County, Pennsylvania, approximately 22 miles northeast of Pittsburgh, located along the Allegheny River. Incorporated in 1842 and founded by Henry Brackenridge, the borough historically served as an industrial center for glass, paper, steel, and brick manufacturing. The borough is connected to New Kensington via the George D. Stuart Bridge and is served by the Highlands School District.

The Pennsylvania Railroad operated a station in Tarentum; its rail line ran through the town. The population was 4,352 at the 2020 census. Two statues of Hebe, the Greek goddess of youth, are displayed by the borough in Tarentum.

== History ==
In the 1750s a Shawnee trader named Peter Chartier had briefly operated a trading post in this area.

The area that would become Tarentum was first settled in 1796 and formally laid out in 1829 by Henry Marie Brackenridge, son of Pittsburgh pioneer Hugh Henry Brackenridge. The borough was incorporated on March 7, 1842.

During the nineteenth and early twentieth centuries, Tarentum developed as an industrial hub along the Allegheny River. Local manufacturers produced plate glass, bottles, bricks, steel, lumber, and paper, and the surrounding hills were mined for coal and iron ore. The borough’s location on the Pennsylvania Railroad and later streetcar lines supported its growth as a working-class river community.

By the early twentieth century, Tarentum was home to several thousand residents and a mix of immigrant communities who came to work in the mills and factories. Industrial decline in the latter half of the century led to population loss and economic transition, but the borough has continued to serve as a residential and commercial center for the Alle-Kiski Valley.

=== Recent Developments ===
In the early twenty-first century, Tarentum undertook several community revitalization and infrastructure initiatives. Since 2019, the borough has removed more than 65 blighted structures as part of a long-term strategy to address abandoned properties and improve neighborhood conditions. Tarentum has also implemented a business façade improvement program and regularly partners with county and regional agencies on economic development projects.

The borough has been recognized for intergovernmental cooperation and local leadership, receiving the Allegheny League of Municipalities Banner Community designation and the Pennsylvania Governor’s Award for Intergovernmental Cooperation. Tarentum also continues to invest in infrastructure, including water and sewer upgrades, electric system improvements, and park redevelopment projects.

== Geography ==
Tarentum is located at 40°36′11″N 79°45′20″W (40.603042, −79.755447).

According to the United States Census Bureau, the borough has a total area of 1.4 square miles (3.6 km^{2}), of which 1.2 square miles (3.1 km^{2}) is land and 0.2 square miles (0.52 km^{2}), or 12.06%, is water.

=== Streams ===
- The Allegheny River forms the borough's eastern border with Westmoreland County.
- Bull Creek joins the Allegheny River at Tarentum.
- Little Bull Creek joins Bull Creek via a culvert underneath Bull Creek Road (Pennsylvania Route 366) at Tarentum.

== Neighboring municipalities ==
Tarentum is bordered by East Deer Township to the west, Frazer Township to the northwest, Fawn Township to the north, Harrison Township to the northeast, and Brackenridge to the east. To the southeast, across the Allegheny River in Westmoreland County, are New Kensington (via Tarentum Bridge) and Lower Burrell.

== Demographics ==
Historical population
Census	Pop.	Note	%±
1850	509		—
1860	711		39.7%
1870	944		32.8%
1880	1,245		31.9%
1890	4,627		271.6%
1900	5,472		18.3%
1910	7,414		35.5%
1920	8,925		20.4%
1930	9,551		7.0%
1940	9,846		3.1%
1950	9,540		−3.1%
1960	8,232		−13.7%
1970	7,379		−10.4%
1980	6,419		−13.0%
1990	5,674		−11.6%
2000	4,993		−12.0%
2010	4,530		−9.3%
2020	4,352		−3.9%
U.S. Decennial Census

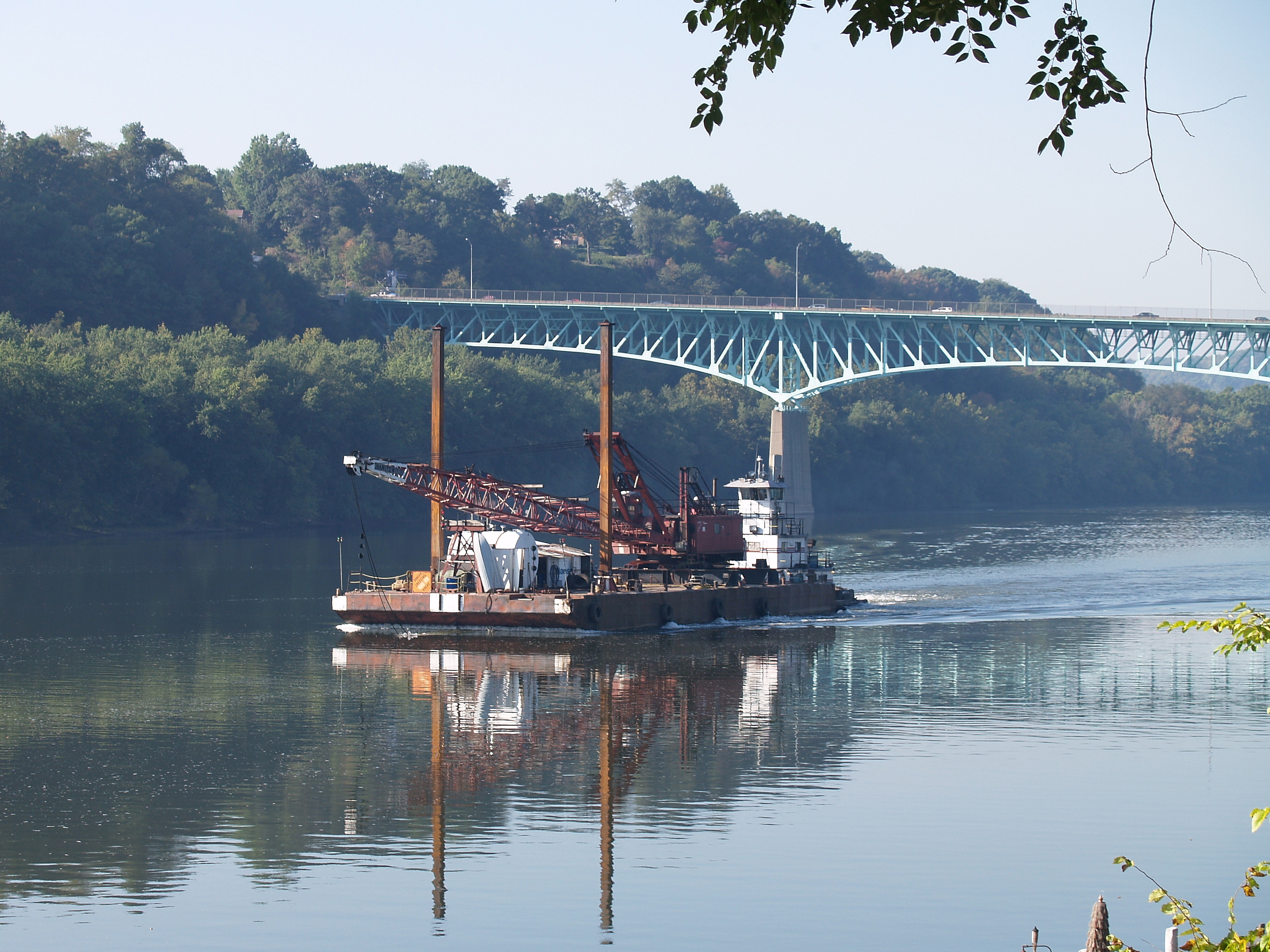
The towboat Annette G pushing a dredger crane barge just upstream from the George D. Stuart Bridge (commonly called the Tarentum Bridge)

=== 2020 census ===
As of the 2020 census, Tarentum had a population of 4,352. The median age was 39.4 years. 21.3% of residents were under the age of 18 and 15.7% of residents were 65 years of age or older. For every 100 females there were 97.6 males, and for every 100 females age 18 and over there were 92.0 males age 18 and over.

98.5% of residents lived in urban areas, while 1.5% lived in rural areas.

There were 1,996 households in Tarentum, of which 27.1% had children under the age of 18 living in them. Of all households, 27.8% were married-couple households, 26.8% were households with a male householder and no spouse or partner present, and 36.8% were households with a female householder and no spouse or partner present. About 39.2% of all households were made up of individuals and 12.2% had someone living alone who was 65 years of age or older.

There were 2,334 housing units, of which 14.5% were vacant. The homeowner vacancy rate was 2.7% and the rental vacancy rate was 7.8%.

Racial composition as of the 2020 census
Race	Number	Percent
White	3,589	82.5%
Black or African American	356	8.2%
American Indian and Alaska Native	6	0.1%
Asian	24	0.6%
Native Hawaiian and Other Pacific Islander	1	0.0%
Some other race	40	0.9%
Two or more races	336	7.7%
Hispanic or Latino (of any race)	96	2.2%

=== 2000 census ===
As of the 2000 census, there were 4,993 people, 2,170 households, and 1,306 families residing in the borough. The population density was 4,011.0 inhabitants per square mile (1,548.7/km^{2}). There were 2,556 housing units at an average density of 2,053.3 per square mile (792.8/km^{2}). The racial makeup of the borough was 93.79% White, 3.65% African American, 0.28% Native American, 0.60% Asian, 0.04% Pacific Islander, 0.26% from other races, and 1.38% from two or more races. Hispanic or Latino of any race were 0.90% of the population.

There were 2,170 households, out of which 26.6% had children under the age of 18 living with them, 41.0% were married couples living together, 14.0% had a female householder with no husband present, and 39.8% were non-families. 34.2% of all households were made up of individuals, and 13.2% had someone living alone who was 65 years of age or older. The average household size was 2.28 and the average family size was 2.92.

In the borough the population was spread out, with 22.0% under the age of 18, 8.8% from 18 to 24, 31.5% from 25 to 44, 22.0% from 45 to 64, and 15.8% who were 65 years of age or older. The median age was 38 years. For every 100 females there were 88.1 males. For every 100 females age 18 and over, there were 85.8 males.

The median income for a household in the borough was $26,895, and the median income for a family was $32,042. Males had a median income of $28,578 versus $21,891 for females. The per capita income for the borough was $14,671. About 12.1% of families and 15.6% of the population were below the poverty line, including 24.1% of those under age 18 and 7.3% of those age 65 or over.

== Museums and other points of interest ==
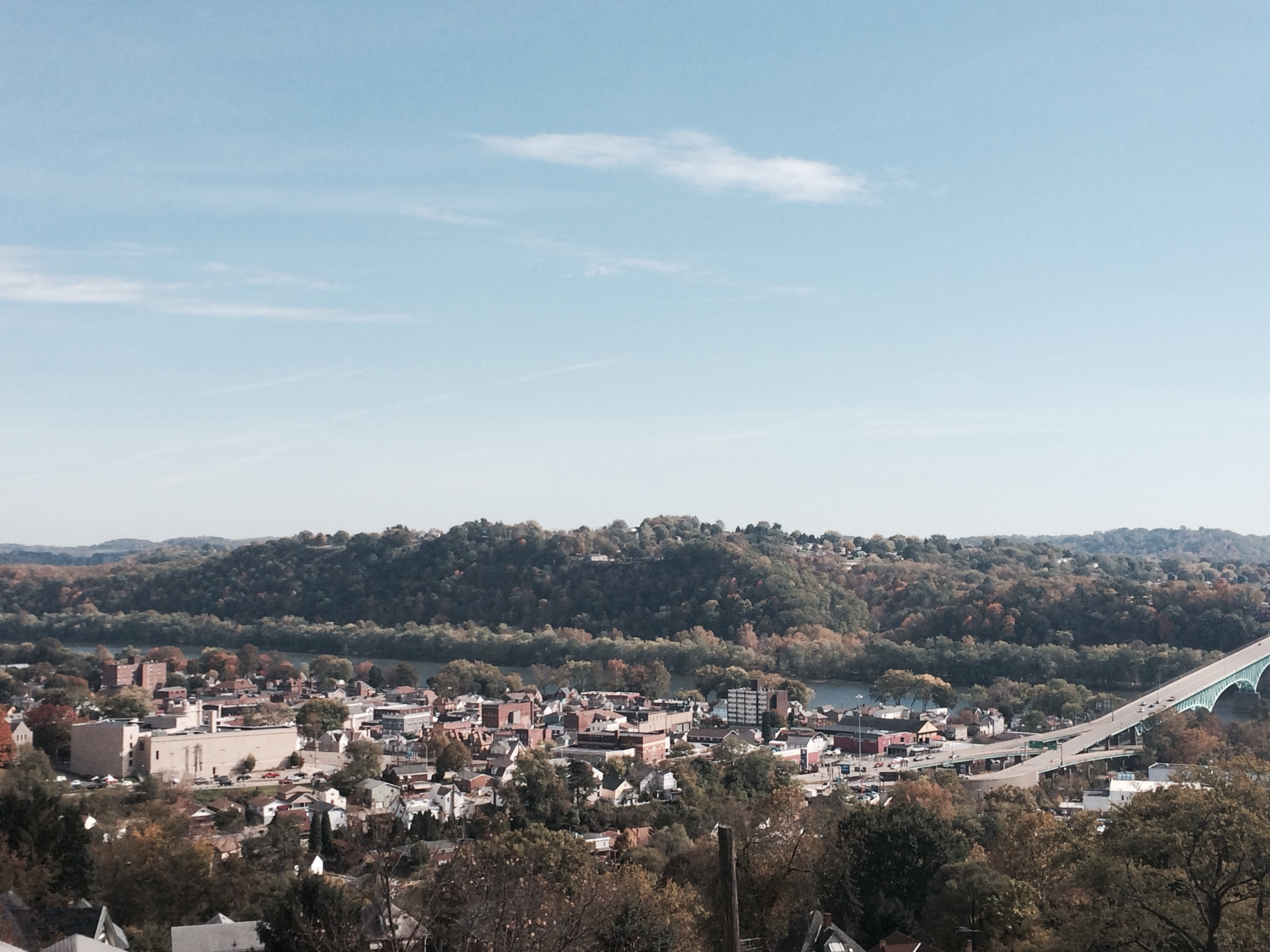
2015 view of Tarentum

- The Community Library of Allegheny Valley, Tarentum Branch, serves the borough and regional municipalities.
- Allegheny-Kiski Valley Heritage Museum is at 224 East Seventh Avenue.http://www.akvhs.org/
- Pittsburgh Mills in nearby Frazer Township uses a Tarentum postal code; it is the 22nd-largest shopping mall in the United States.

== Education ==
Tarentum is within the Highlands School District, which operates Highlands Elementary School (grades 1–4) in the borough; also Highlands Early Childhood Center (Pre-k and K), Highlands Middle School (grades 5–8), and Highlands High School (grades 9–12) in nearby communities. The Golden Rams are the Highlands School District's mascot.

== Government and politics ==
Presidential election results
Year	Republican	Democratic	Third parties
2020	53% 986	44% 808	1% 35
2016	52% 780	47% 710	1% 21
2012	45% 647	54% 780	1% 24

Tarentum Borough operates under a council–manager form of government. In this system, policy decisions are made by an elected Borough Council, while administrative and day-to-day operations are handled by a professional Borough Manager. The current Mayor is Robert Lang, who began his first full term in January 2022. Council is led by President Scott Dadowski and includes representatives from each ward and at-large members. Dwight Boddorf serves as Borough Manager, appointed in September 2022 to oversee municipal operations and implement council directives. This structure is designed to balance democratic leadership with professional administration, promoting efficiency and accountability in local governance.

== Usage in popular culture ==
- Knightriders – (1981)
- Out of the Black – (2001)
- My Bloody Valentine 3D – (2009)

== Notable people ==
- Martin Chartier, a French-Canadian fur trader who established a trading post in 1694 with his son, Peter Chartier, in what is now Tarentum.
- John Filo, photographer, took award-winning Kent State photo while employed in Tarentum.
- John Baptiste Ford (1811–1903), industrialist and founder of the Pittsburgh Plate Glass Company, now known as PPG Industries.
- John Grant (1891–1955), burlesque producer and performer, later headwriter for Abbott and Costello.
- Estelle Harris (1928–2022), actress who played George Costanza's mother on Seinfeld, lived in Tarentum and graduated from the former Tarentum High School.
- Samuel Kier (1813–1874), pioneer oil refiner, operated salt wells in Tarentum
- John L. Miller (1925–1989), politician and judge who represented District 3C in the New Jersey Senate from 1968 to 1974
- Evelyn Nesbit, artists' model and chorus girl, pursued by architect Stanford White and murderer Harry Thaw; she married the latter.
