= Fawn Township, Allegheny County, Pennsylvania =

Township in Pennsylvania, US

Fawn Township
- Township
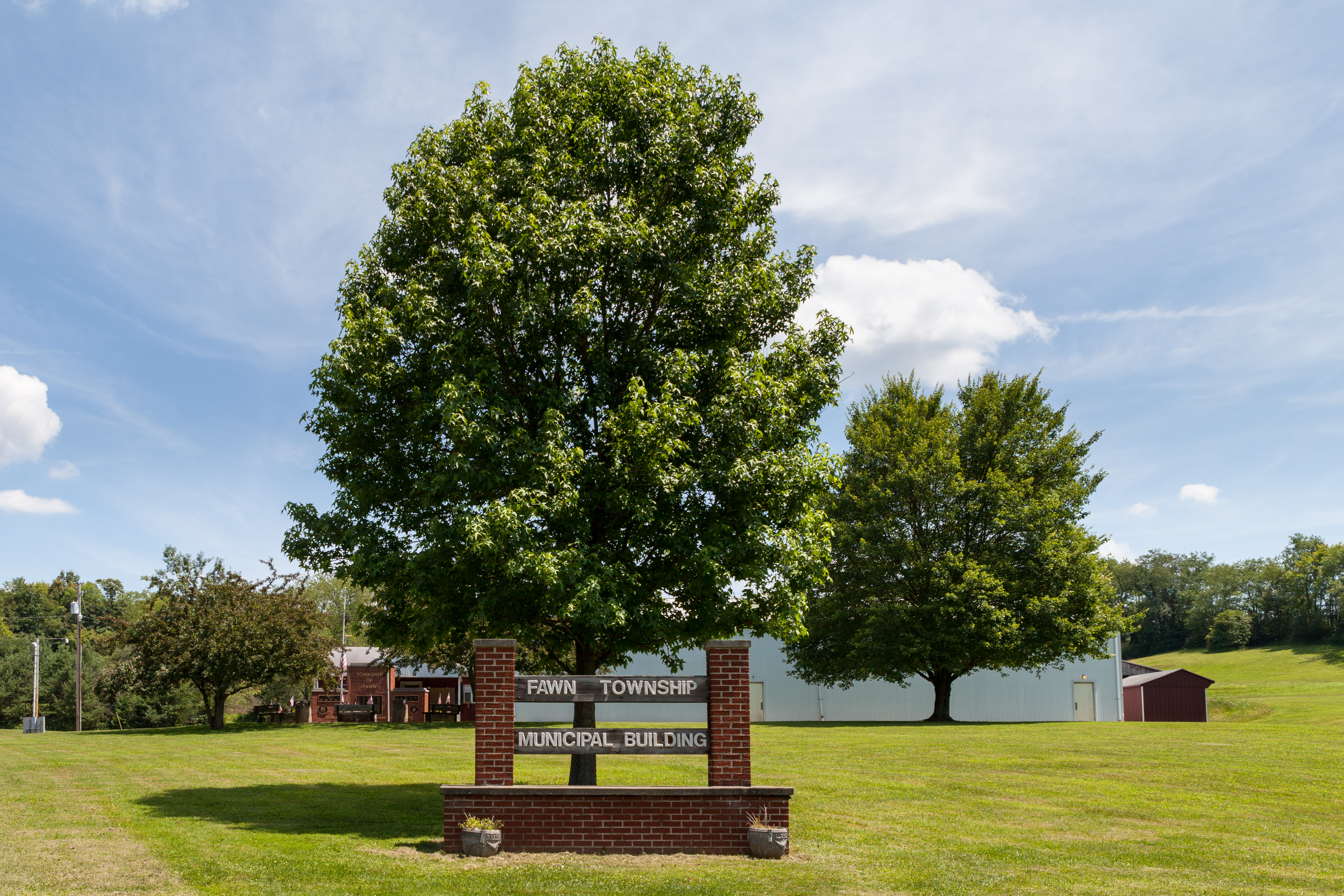
- Municipal Building

- Location in Allegheny County and state of Pennsylvania

- Location of Pennsylvania in the United States
- Coordinates: 40°39′13″N 79°44′29″W
- Country: United States
- State: Pennsylvania
- County: Allegheny

Government
  - Body: Board of Supervisors
  - President: Dan Selfridge (R)

Area
  - Total: 12.95 sq mi (33.53 km^{2})
  - Land: 12.95 sq mi (33.53 km^{2})
  - Water: 0 sq mi (0.00 km^{2})
- Elevation: 1,148 ft (350 m)

Population (2020)
  - Total: 2,193 ▼
  - Estimate (2022): 2,145
  - Density: 181/sq mi (69.7/km^{2})
- Time zone: UTC-5 (EST)
  - Summer (DST): UTC-4 (EDT)
- ZIP code: 15084, 15065
- Area codes: 724, 878
- FIPS code: 42-003-25400
- School District: Highlands
- Website: fawntownship.com

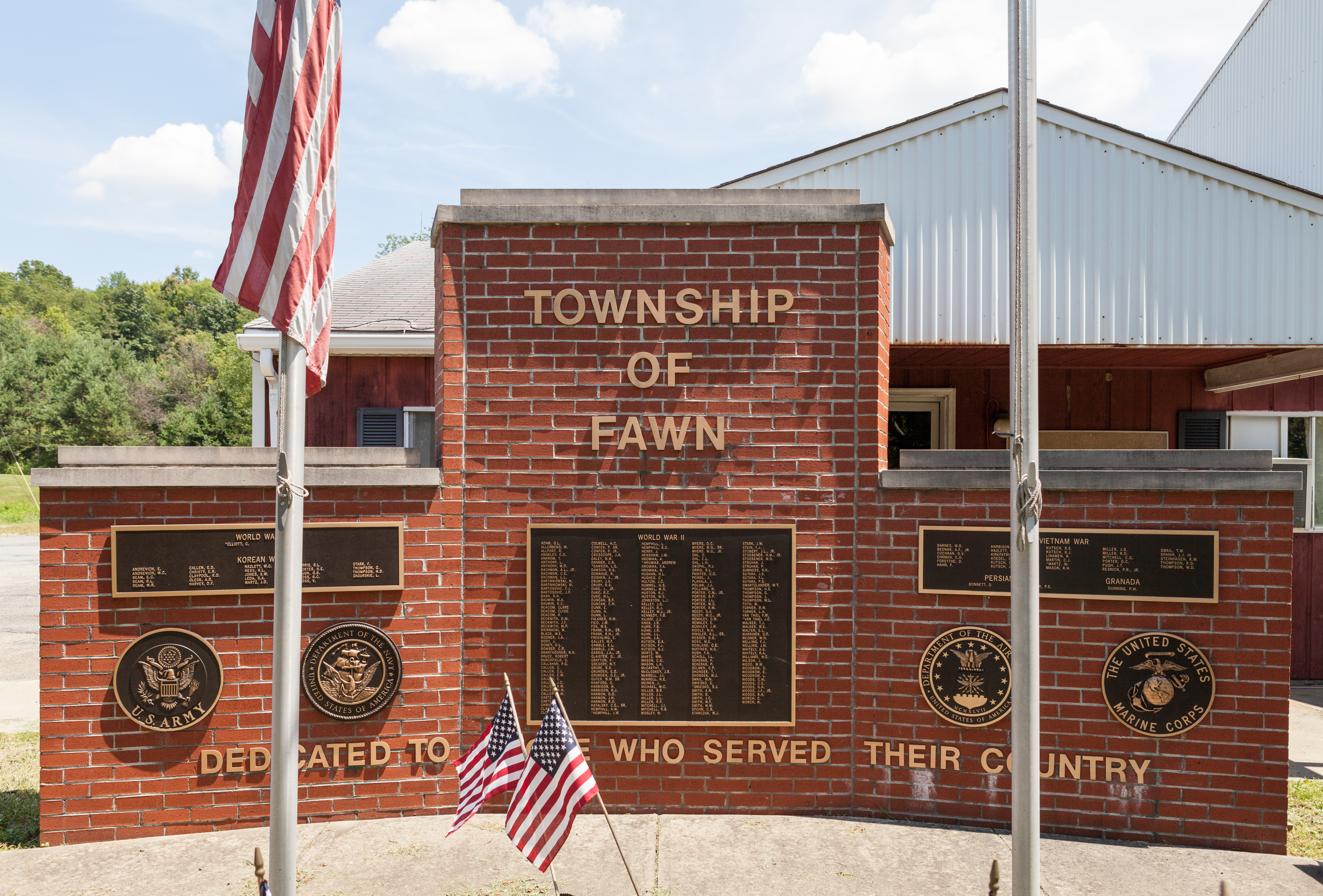
Veterans Memorial

Fawn Township is a township in Allegheny County, Pennsylvania, United States. The population was 2,193 at the 2020 census. The township derives its name either directly after Fahan, County Donegal, Ireland, by Irish settlers of which 'fawn' is the phonetic pronunciation, or indirectly from the York County township of that name with name origin. According to the township itself, Fawn Township derived its name from its parent township, Deer Township, from which it was formed March 28, 1858.

== Geography ==
According to the United States Census Bureau, the township has a total area of 12.9 square miles (33 km^{2}), all land.

=== Surrounding neighborhoods ===
Fawn Township has five borders: with Buffalo Township in Butler County to the north, Harrison Township to the east, Tarentum to the south, Frazer Township to the southwest and West Deer Township to the west.

=== Streams ===
- Bull Creek runs through Fawn Township.
- McDowell Run joins Bull Creek near the intersection of Bull Creek Road and Howes Run Road in Fawn Township.
- Lardintown Run joins Bull Creek near the intersection of Bull Creek Road and Lardintown Road in Fawn Township.
- Little Bull Creek runs through Fawn Township.

== Government and politics ==
Presidential elections results
Year	Republican	Democratic	Third parties
2020	68% 873	30% 394	0.9% 12
2016	67% 710	29% 304	4% 48
2012	63% 639	36% 371	1% 16

== History ==
An underground coal mine operated in the vicinity beginning in 1850. After it closed, a coal mining museum was built at the site.

== Demographics ==
Historical population
Census	Pop.	Note	%±
1970	3,167		—
1980	2,899		−8.5%
1990	2,712		−6.5%
2000	2,504		−7.7%
2010	2,376		−5.1%
2020	2,193		−7.7%
2024 (est.)	2,124		−3.1%
U.S. Decennial Census

As of the 2000 census, there were 2,504 people, 985 households, and 750 families residing in the township. The population density was 193.8 inhabitants per square mile (74.8/km^{2}). There were 1,031 housing units at an average density of 79.8 per square mile (30.8/km^{2}). The racial makeup of the township was 98.72% White, 0.20% African American, 0.04% Native American, 0.68% Asian, 0.04% Pacific Islander, 0.08% from other races, and 0.24% from two or more races. Hispanic or Latino of any race were 0.24% of the population.

Ancestry was reported as 27% German, 13% Irish, 11% Slovak and 10% Polish.

There were 985 households, out of which 29.8% had children under the age of 18 living with them, 65.5% were married couples living together, 7.2% had a female householder with no husband present, and 23.8% were non-families. 20.6% of all households were made up of individuals, and 10.1% had someone living alone who was 65 years of age or older. The average household size was 2.53 and the average family size was 2.93.

Fawn's population distribution by age was 21.0% under the age of 18, 6.5% from 18 to 24, 28.4% from 25 to 44, 26.6% from 45 to 64, and 17.6% aged 65 years or older. The median age was 42 years. For every 100 females, there were 101.4 males. For every 100 females age 18 and over, there were 99.8 males.

The median income for a household in the township was $37,102, and the median income for a family was $45,114. Males had a median income of $38,884 versus $22,041 for females. The per capita income for the township was $18,566. About 4.6% of families and 6.4% of the population were below the poverty line, including 5.8% of those under age 18 and 10.1% of those age 65 or over.

== Education ==
Fawn Township is within the Highlands School District, which operates Fawn Primary Center (K–2), formerly Fawn Elementary School (K–5), along Ridge Road. The mailing address for the school is Natrona Heights.

== Usage in popular culture ==
The film Knightriders (1981) by George A. Romero, starring Ed Harris, used scenes shot in Fawn Township (1980) for the movie.

My Bloody Valentine 3D (2009) was filmed on location at the Fawn Tavern on Bull Creek Road and The Tour Ed Mine on Ridge Road.
