= Brannon Run (Allegheny River tributary) =

Waterway in Venango County, Pennsylvania

Brannon Run Tributary to Allegheny River
- Location within Pennsylvania Location within the United States

Location
- Country: United States
- State: Pennsylvania
- County: Venango
- City: Reno

Physical characteristics
- Source: Read Run divide
  - location: about 2 miles northwest of Oil City, Pennsylvania
  - coordinates: 41°26′48″N 079°44′42″W
  - elevation: 1,490 ft (450 m)
- Mouth: Allegheny River
  - location: Reno, Pennsylvania
  - coordinates: 41°24′42″N 079°45′23″W
  - elevation: 972 ft (296 m)
- Length: 2.93 mi (4.72 km)
- Basin size: 2.25 square miles (5.8 km^{2})
- Discharge
  - location: Allegheny River
  - average: 4.04 cu ft/s (0.114 m^{3}/s) at mouth with Allegheny River

Basin features
- Progression: south and southwest
- River system: Allegheny River
- Tributaries
  - left: unnamed tributaries
  - right: unnamed tributaries
- Bridges: US 62

Brannon Run is a 2.93 mi (4.72 km) long 1st order tributary to the Allegheny River in Venango County, Pennsylvania.

== Course ==
Brannon Run rises about 2 miles northwest of Oil City, Pennsylvania, and then flows south and southwest to join the Allegheny River at Reno.

== Watershed ==
Brannon Run drains 2.25 square miles (5.8 km^{2}) of area, receives about 44.4 in/year of precipitation, and has a wetness index of 357.00 and is about 77% forested.

== Additional Maps ==
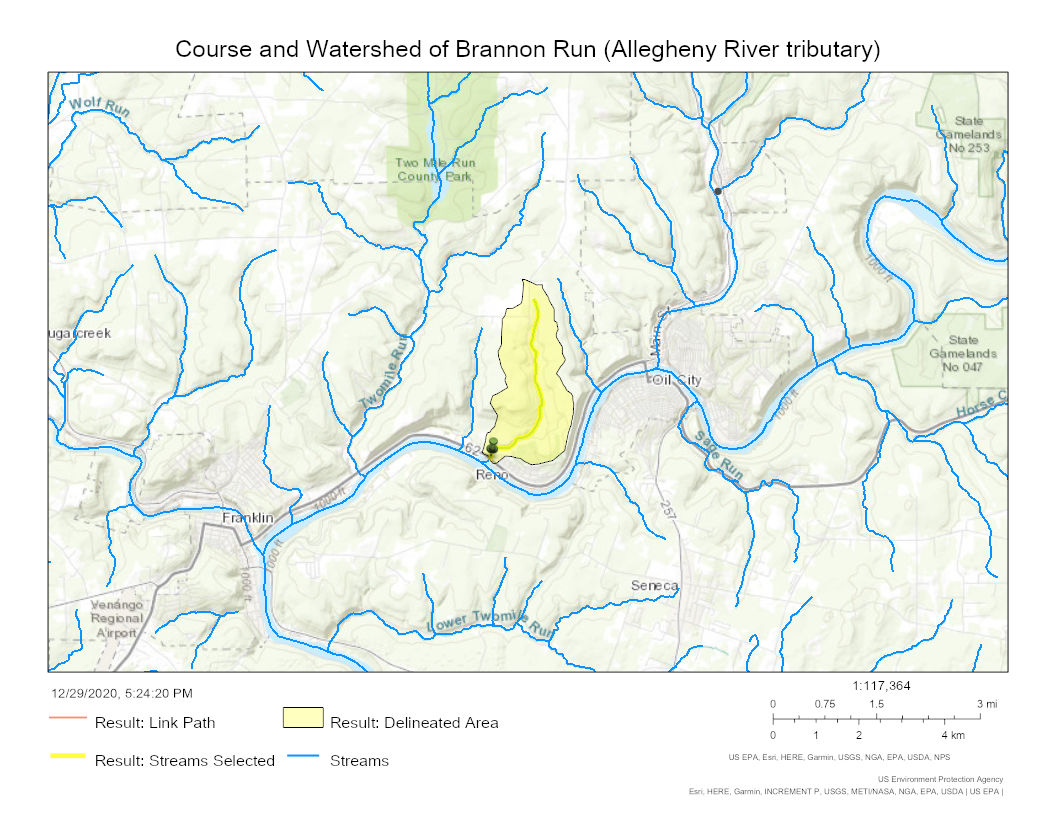
Course and Watershed of Brannon Run (Allegheny River tributary) in Venango County, Pennsylvania
