= Little Bull Creek (Allegheny River tributary) =

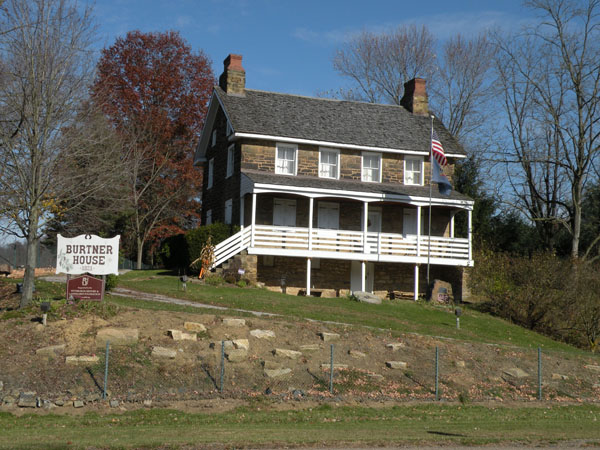
- The Burtner Stone House was built in 1821 along Little Bull Creek.

Location
- Country: United States

Physical characteristics
- Source
  - coordinates: 40.7003431°N 79.7556058°W
- Mouth
  - coordinates: 40.6106221°N 79.7556043°W
  - elevation: 784 ft (239 m)

Basin features
- River system: Allegheny River

Little Bull Creek is a tributary of Bull Creek and part of the Allegheny River watershed located in both Allegheny and Butler counties in Pennsylvania, U.S.

== Course ==
Little Bull Creek rises in Butler County. It then flows into Allegheny County, generally along the southeastern side of Pennsylvania Route 28. The stream joins Bull Creek via a culvert underneath Bull Creek Road (a section of Pennsylvania Route 366) at the borough of Tarentum.

== See also ==
- List of rivers of Pennsylvania
- List of tributaries of the Allegheny River
