= Jacks Island (Pennsylvania) =

Island in Pennsylvania, USA

Coordinates: 40°37′6″N 79°42′39″W

Jacks Island is an alluvial island in the Allegheny River. Its southwestern half lies in the city of Lower Burrell, while its northeastern half lies in Allegheny Township, in Westmoreland County in the U.S. state of Pennsylvania. The island is situated across from Harrison Township in Allegheny County.

The elevation of Jacks Island is 745 feet above sea level.
