= Highlands High School (Pennsylvania) =

Location
- 1500 Pacific Avenue; Natrona Heights; Harrison Township, Pennsylvania 15065; United States; 40.617843°N 79.726903°W

Information
- Type: Public
- Established: 1969
- School district: Highlands School District
- Principal: Patrick Baughman
- Teaching staff: 47.09 (FTE)
- Enrollment: 701 (2023-2024)
- Student to teacher ratio: 14.89
- Colors: Brown and gold
- Song: "Highlands High School Alma Mater"
- Fight song: "Go Highlands", "Fite Fite Fite"
- Mascot: Ram
- Team name: Golden Rams
- Accreditation: Middle States Association of Colleges and Schools
- Newspaper: Rampages
- Yearbook: Aries
- Feeder schools: Highlands Middle School
- Website: Highlands High School

Highlands High School is a suburban, public secondary school in the Natrona Heights neighborhood of Harrison Township in the U.S. state of Pennsylvania. It is part of the Highlands School District and has a current enrollment of about 800 students in grades nine through twelve.

== Extracurriculars ==
The district offers a variety of clubs, activities and sports. Highlands School District is a member of the WPIAL and PIAA. Highlands School District teams compete at the class AAA or AA level.

The district offers the following sports programs:

- Boys - baseball 9–12, basketball 7–12, cross country 9–12, marching band 9–12, football 7–12, golf 9–12, soccer 7–12, swimming 9–12, tennis 9–12, track & field 7–12, wrestling 9-12
- Girls - basketball 7–12, cross country 9–12, marching band (sometimes 8 but usually) 9–12, soccer 7–12, softball 7–12, swimming 9–12, tennis 9–12, track & field 7–12, volleyball 9-12

== Notable alumni ==
- Cookie Gilchrist, former NFL player
- Dick Modzelewski, former NFL player
- Ed Modzelewski, former NFL player
- Cliff Montgomery, former NFL player

== See also ==
- List of high schools in Pennsylvania
