= Harrison Township, Allegheny County, Pennsylvania =

Township in Pennsylvania, US

Harrison Township
- Township
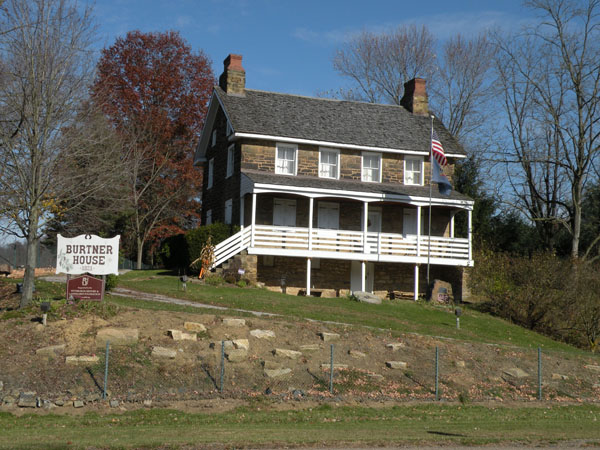
- The Burtner Stone House, built in 1821, is along Burtner Road in Harrison Township.

- Logo
- Interactive map of Harrison Township
- Location within Pennsylvania Location within the United States
- Coordinates: 40°37′36″N 79°43′29″W
- Country: United States
- State: Pennsylvania
- County: Allegheny
- Incorporated: 1900

Government
  - Body: Board of Commissioners
  - President: Gary Meanor (Democratic)

Area
  - Total: 7.88 sq mi (20.42 km^{2})
  - Land: 7.36 sq mi (19.06 km^{2})
  - Water: 0.53 sq mi (1.36 km^{2})

Population (2020)
  - Total: 10,169 ▼
  - Estimate (2022): 9,908
  - Density: 1,409.2/sq mi (544.08/km^{2})
- Time zone: UTC-5 (EST)
  - Summer (DST): UTC-4 (EDT)
- ZIP code: 15065
- Area codes: 724, 878
- FIPS code: 42-003-32832
- School district: Highlands
- Website: http://harrisontwp.com/

Harrison Township is a township in Allegheny County in the U.S. state of Pennsylvania. The population was 10,169 at the 2020 census. Pennsylvania Route 28 passes through Harrison Township, connecting Kittanning to the northeast and Pittsburgh to the southwest. Allegheny Technologies has extensive steel mill facilities in Harrison Township, including its Allegheny Ludlum Brackenridge Works. Harrison Township is located at the far northeast corner of Allegheny County. Its northern border is the Butler County line and the Allegheny River forms the township's eastern boundary with Westmoreland County. Its northeast corner also touches Armstrong County.

== Geography ==
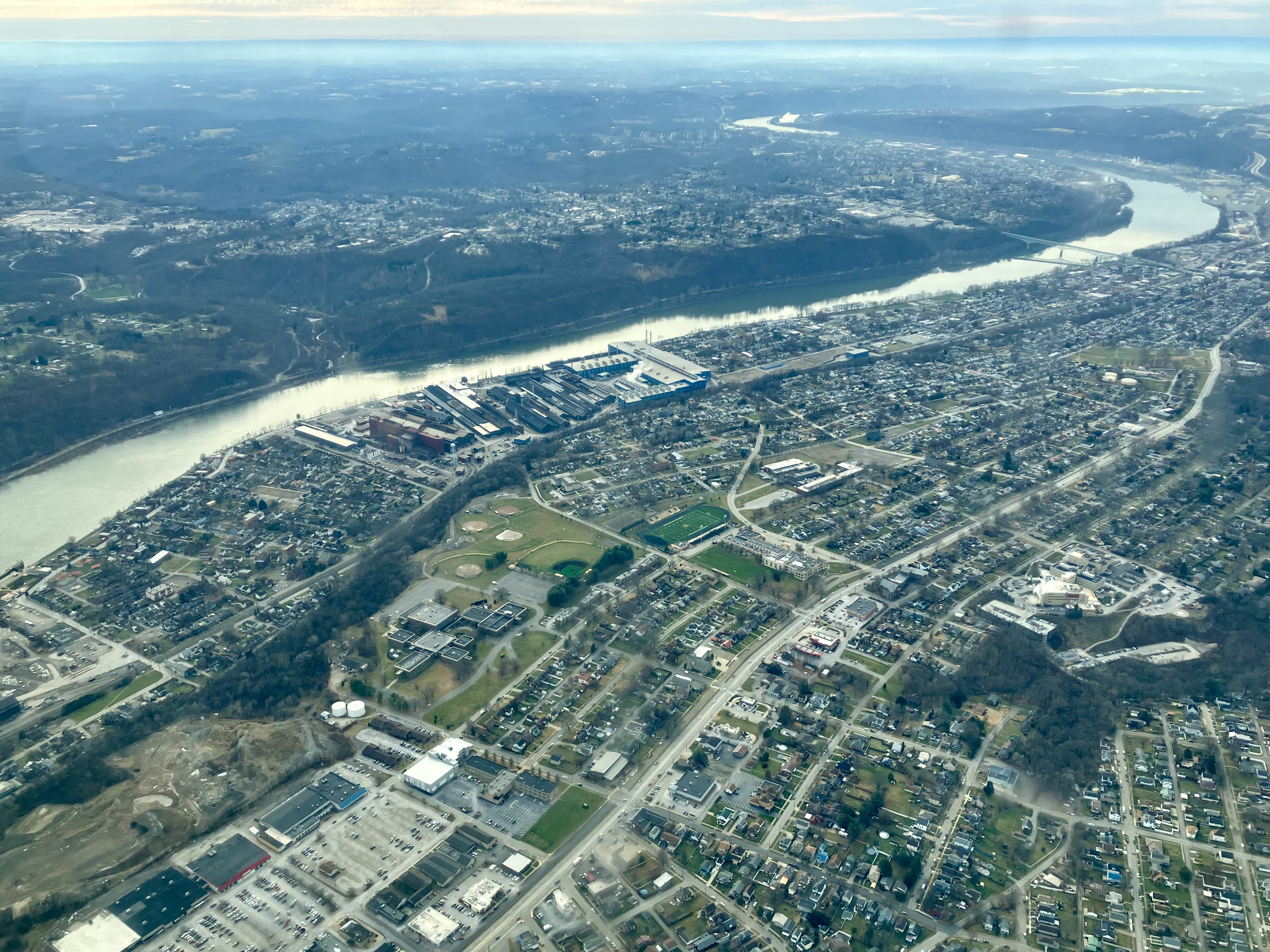
Aerial view in 2024

Harrison Township is located at 40°37′36″N 79°43′29″W (40.626826, -79.724797).

According to the United States Census Bureau, the township has a total area of 7.7 square miles (20 km^{2}), of which 7.3 square miles (19 km^{2}) is land and 0.5 square miles (1.3 km^{2}), or 5.95%, is water.

=== Streams ===
- Little Bull Creek flows southwest through Harrison Township.
- The entire course of Rachel Carson Run is within Harrison Township. The stream forms a series of falls in Harrison Hills Park.

=== Surrounding and adjacent neighborhoods ===
Harrison Township has four land borders with Buffalo Township in Butler County to the north, Brackenridge to the south-southwest, Tarentum to the southwest and Fawn Township to the west. Across the Allegheny River in Westmoreland County to the east, Harrison Township runs adjacent with Allegheny Township and Lower Burrell

== Government and politics ==
Presidential Elections Results
Year	Republican	Democratic	Third Parties
2020	47% 2,214	51% 2,386	1% 70
2016	55% 2,564	42% 1,967	4% 162
2012	51% 2,265	47% 2,089	2% 47

Harrison Township operates as a first-class township under the council–manager form of government. In this structure, the elected Board of Commissioners serves as the legislative body, setting policies and enacting ordinances, while a professional Township Manager oversees daily administrative operations. As of 2025, Gary Meanor serves as Chairman of the Board of Commissioners, and Amy Rockwell holds the position of Township Manager.

This governance model aims to combine democratic oversight with professional management, ensuring efficient and accountable local administration.

== Demographics ==
Historical population
Census	Pop.	Note	%±
1970	14,448		—
1980	13,252		−8.3%
1990	11,763		−11.2%
2000	10,934		−7.0%
2010	10,461		−4.3%
2020	10,169		−2.8%
2022 (est.)	9,908		−2.6%
U.S. Decennial Census

As of the census of 2000, there were 10,934 people, 4,796 households, and 3,126 families residing in the township. The population density was 1,503.6 inhabitants per square mile (580.5/km^{2}). There were 5,246 housing units at an average density of 721.4 per square mile (278.5/km^{2}). The racial makeup of the township was 94.81% White, 3.69% Black or African American, 0.05% Native American, 0.41% Asian, 0.11% from other races, and 0.91% from two or more races. Hispanic or Latino of any race were 0.55% of the population.

There were 4,796 households, out of which 25.9% had children under the age of 18 living with them, 48.4% were married couples living together, 13.2% had a female householder with no husband present, and 34.8% were non-families. 31.7% of all households were made up of individuals, and 16.9% had someone living alone who was 65 years of age or older. The average household size was 2.27 and the average family size was 2.83.

In the township, the population was spread out, with 21.0% under the age of 18, 6.7% from 18 to 24, 26.6% from 25 to 44, 23.7% from 45 to 64, and 22.1% who were 65 years of age or older. The median age was 43 years. For every 100 females, there were 86.0 males. For every 100 females age 18 and over, there were 81.5 males.

The median income for a household in the township was $33,482, and the median income for a family was $42,309. Males had a median income of $36,743 versus $22,111 for females. The per capita income for the township was $18,011. About 9.6% of families and 11.4% of the population were below the poverty line, including 20.3% of those under age 18 and 8.1% of those age 65 or over.

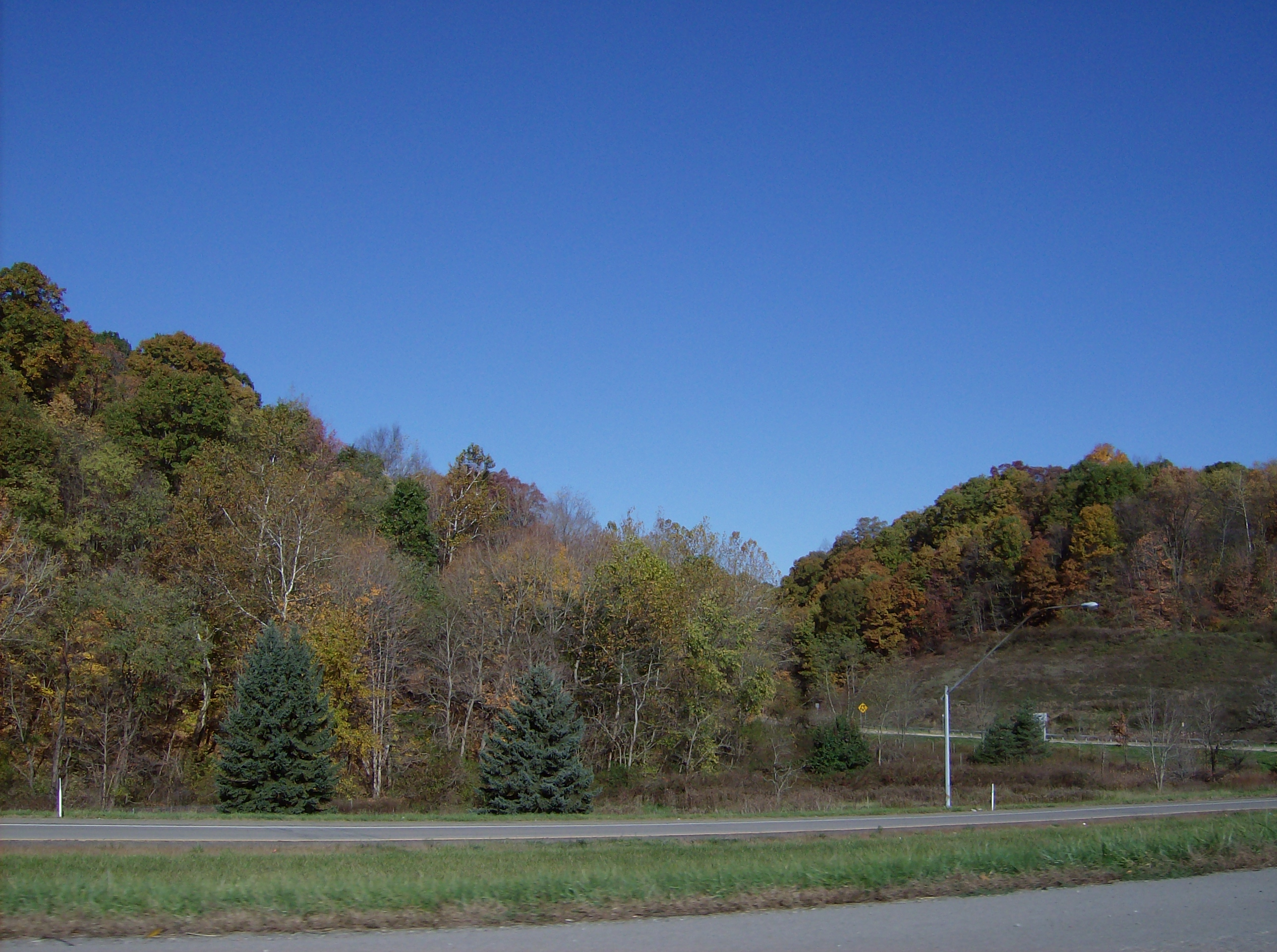
Hilly woodlands in northwest Harrison Township along Pennsylvania Route 28

== Museums and other points of interest ==
The Community Library of Allegheny Valley, Harrison Branch serves the township.

The Burtner House located in Harrison Township. This is a historical landmarks. They hold the Strawberry Festival every summer.

== Education ==
=== Current buildings ===
Harrison Township is within the Highlands School District. Highlands High School (9–12), Highlands Middle School (6–8), the district's Buildings and Grounds Complex (maintenance), and Highlands School District administrative offices are in the township. Highlands Golden Rams Stadium (track and football), tennis courts, a soccer field, and the Highlands Community Center are adjacent to the middle school; and several baseball fields are next to the high school.

=== Former buildings ===
Historical schools, which are now closed, include: Natrona High School, later used for the Wood Street Elementary School (K–6), then sold and converted into apartments; Riverview Elementary School, used for the administrative offices since the early 1980s, slated to be sold after January 2012; and Birdville Elementary School, which was converted into the Citizens Hose Volunteer Fire Department. Heights Elementary School (K–5) was reassigned as the Heights Early Childhood Center (Kindergarten, the Pre-K Counts Program, Head Start, and the YMCA Before/After Childcare Program) in late June 2011; it closed in June 2012.

== Parks and recreation ==
Several parks are located throughout the township: Harrison Hills Park is a county park located in the northeast area of the township; the Natrona neighborhood has a community playground and riverfront park.

== Notable people ==
- Leon Czolgosz, who assassinated U.S. President William McKinley on September 6, 1901. He lived in Natrona while a teenager, from 1889 until 1892.
