= Highlands School District (Pennsylvania) =

School district in Pennsylvania

Address
- 1500 Pacific Avenue PO Box 288 Natrona Heights, Pennsylvania, 15065-0288; United States

District information
- Type: Public

Students and staff
- District mascot: Ram
- Colors: Brown and gold

Other information
- Website: goldenrams.com

The Highlands School District is a small, suburban public school district covering Tarentum and Brackenridge boroughs, as well as Fawn and Harrison townships in Allegheny County, in the U.S. state of Pennsylvania.

Highlands School District encompasses approximately 22 square miles. According to 2000 federal census data, it serves a resident population of 21,974. In 2009 the per capita income was $17,481, while the median family income was $40,715.

In July 2011, the school board voted to rename the districts' elementary schools and to realign attendance zones. The goals were to equalize student distribution between primary centers, reduce bus time and save money.

The district operates both Highlands High School (9–12) and Highlands Middle School (5–8) in Harrison Township; Highlands Elementary School (formerly Grandview Elementary) (1–4) in Tarentum; Highlands Early Childhood Center (formerly Fairmount Primary School) (PK-K) in Brackenridge. The districts also operates a virtual academy for students in grades K-12.
