= Disillusioned (book) =

2024 book by Benjamin Herold

Disillusioned: Five Families and the Unraveling of America's Suburbs is a 2024 book by Benjamin Herold, published by Penguin Press.

It describes declines of suburbs in the United States. The book covers Compton, California (Los Angeles metropolitan area), Evanston, Illinois (Chicago metropolitan area), Penn Hills, Pennsylvania (Pittsburgh metropolitan area), and the Atlanta and Dallas areas. The book specifically highlights five families and their problems.

== Background ==
Herold, a White American, originated from Penn Hills, and was inspired to write this book after seeing a decline in the community in 2020.

== Contents ==
The families chronicled include those of Bethany Smith, an African-American woman from Penn Hill.

The effects of racism in the United States on how suburbs evolve are discussed.

According to Brooke Masters of Financial Times, the author "does find some room for hope in Compton".

He criticizes some decisions of the Penn Hills School District, including building a new facility for Penn Hills Senior High School even though the number of students in the district was decreasing.

Text about effects of the COVID-19 pandemic in the United States on suburbia form the book's last regular chapter.

The end portion was written directly by Smith, who felt that having only Herold cover her story would not be sufficient; Herold decided to allow her to directly write a portion.

== Reception ==
Ben Austen of The New York Times described the book as "important, cleareyed".

Masters compares the book to Common Ground, a book by J. Anthony Lukas. Masters stated that the author's "personal anguish [...] gives the book extra power."

Kirkus Reviews stated that the work is "well-informed, ambitious" and "deeply valuable".
