= Tarentum =

Tarentum may refer to:

- Taranto, Apulia, Italy, on the site of the ancient Roman city of Tarentum (formerly the Greek colony of Taras)
  - See also History of Taranto
- Tarentum (Campus Martius), also Terentum, an area in or on the edge of the Campus Martius in Rome
- Tarentum, Pennsylvania, United States
  - Tarentum Bridge, in the above place
- ST Tarentum, a tug in service with Società Rim. Napoletani (1962–82); originally known as Empire Bess
