= Pennsylvania Route 791 =

State highway in Allegheny County, Pennsylvania, US

Pennsylvania Route 791

Route information
- Maintained by PennDOT
- Length: 2.10 mi (3.38 km)
- Existed: 1963–present

Major junctions
- South end: US 22 Bus. / Yellow Belt in Churchill
- I-376 / US 22 in Churchill
- North end: PA 380 / Yellow Belt in Penn Hills

Location
- Country: United States
- State: Pennsylvania
- Counties: Allegheny

Highway system
- Pennsylvania State Route System; Interstate; US; State; Scenic; Legislative
← PA 790	→ PA 796
← I-280	→ PA 281

Pennsylvania Route 791 (PA 791) is a state highway located in Penn Hills in Allegheny County, Pennsylvania. It runs 2.10 miles (3.38 km) from U.S. Route 22 Business (US 22 Bus.) in Churchill to PA 380 in Penn Hills. The entire route is part of the Yellow Belt of the Allegheny County belt system. The route runs through a suburban area of Pittsburgh.

== Route description ==
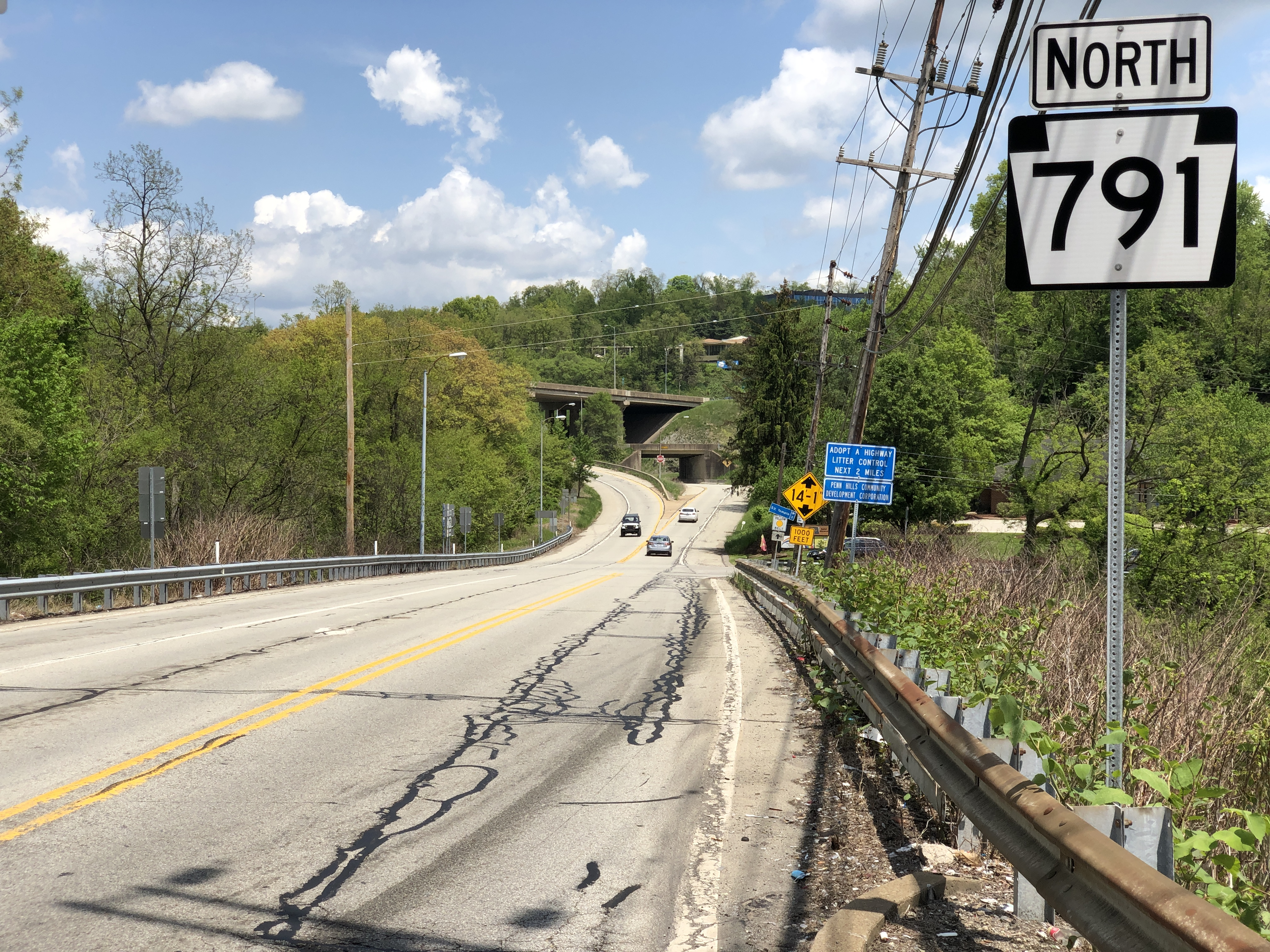
PA 791 northbound at US 22 Bus. in Churchill

PA 791 heads north from the southern terminus on Rodi Road, passing through suburbs. At the terminus, the road continues in both directions as US 22 Bus. and as part of the Yellow Belt Shortly after the intersection, it heads under Interstate 376 and receives traffic from exit 80. Two miles to the north, it ends at PA 380 in Penn Hills at a shopping plaza.

== History ==
PA 791 was originally assigned as PA 280, along with the remainder of Rodi Road from US 22 Bus. to Thompson Run Road in Wilkins Township, in 1928. The route was decommissioned in 1946 and the northern segment received its current route number in 1963.

== Major intersections ==
The entire route is in Allegheny County.

Location	mi	km	Destinations	Notes
Churchill	0.00	0.00	US 22 Bus. / Yellow Belt (William Penn Highway) to I-376 west / US 22 west / PA 130 – Pittsburgh, Churchill, Monroeville, Turtle Creek	Southern terminus; southern end of Yellow Belt concurrency
Churchill	0.26	0.42	I-376 / US 22 – Pittsburgh, Murrysville	Southbound exit and northbound entrance; exit 81 on I-376
Penn Hills	2.10	3.38	PA 380 / Yellow Belt (Frankstown Road) – Pittsburgh, Plum	Northern terminus; northern end of Yellow Belt concurrency
1.000 mi = 1.609 km; 1.000 km = 0.621 mi: Concurrency terminus; Incomplete access
