= Pennsylvania Route 366 =

State highway in Pennsylvania, US

Pennsylvania Route 366

Route information
- Maintained by PennDOT
- Length: 14.8 mi (23.8 km)
- Existed: 1928–present

Major junctions
- West end: PA 28 in Tarentum
- PA 56 in New Kensington; PA 780 in New Kensington; PA 380 in Murrysville
- East end: PA 66 in Murrysville

Location
- Country: United States
- State: Pennsylvania
- Counties: Allegheny, Westmoreland

Highway system
- Pennsylvania State Route System; Interstate; US; State; Scenic; Legislative
← PA 364	→ PA 367

Pennsylvania Route 366 (PA 366) is a 14.8-mile-long (23.8 km) state highway located in Allegheny and Westmoreland counties in Pennsylvania. The western terminus is at PA 28 in Tarentum. The eastern terminus is at PA 66 in Murrysville. The last 1/2 mile of the Red Belt route of the Allegheny County belt system runs along PA 366 in Tarentum from its eastbound beginning at the PA 28 interchange to the intersection of Freeport Rd. and Ross St. where the Red Belt terminates.

== Route description ==
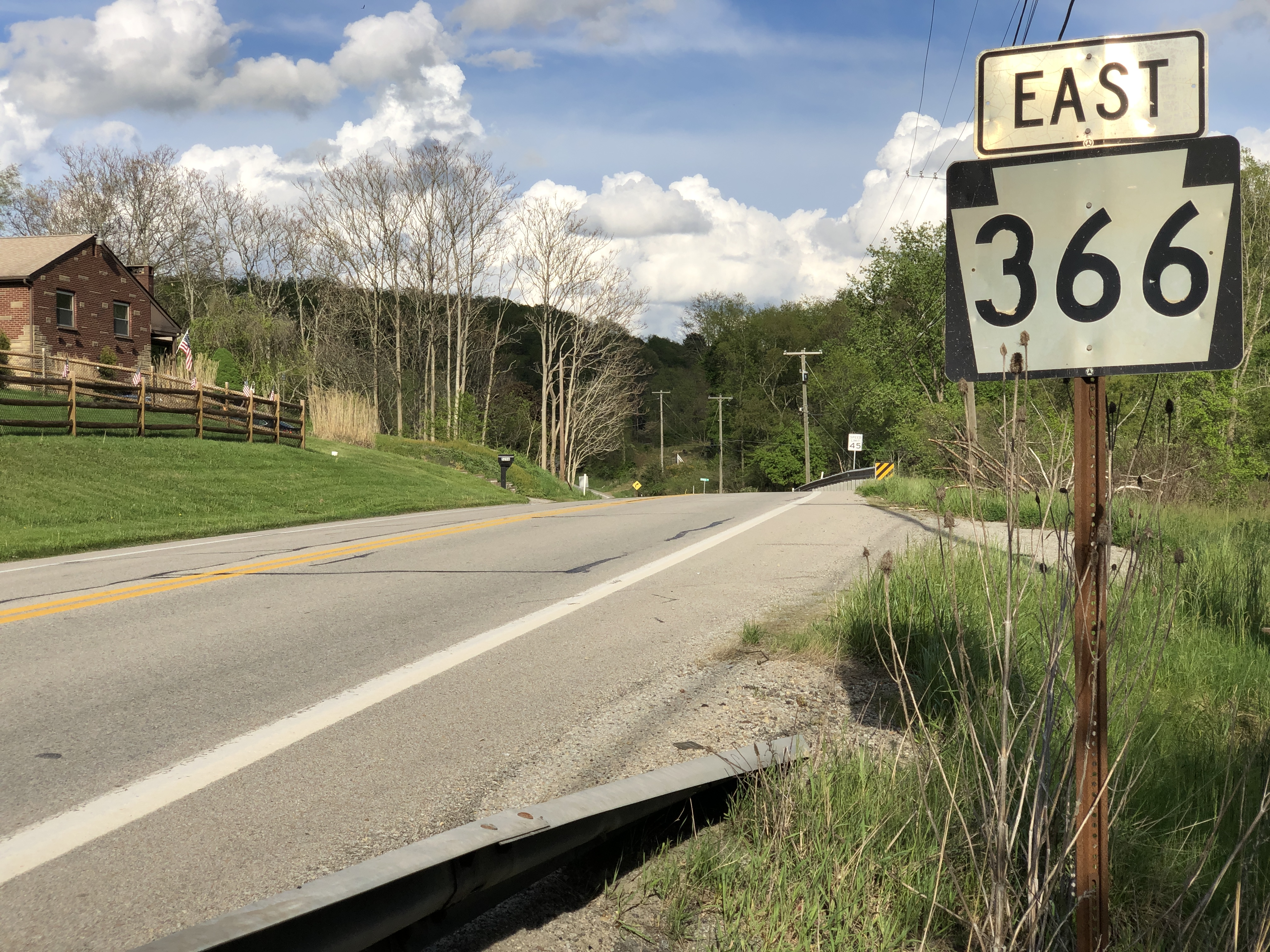
PA 366 eastbound in Washington Township

PA 366 begins at an interchange with the PA 28 freeway in Fawn Township, Allegheny County, heading south on Bull Creek Road, a four-lane divided highway that is part of the Red Belt of the Allegheny County belt system. Within the interchange, the road crosses into the borough of Tarentum and passes through wooded areas. Farther south, the route becomes Ross Street and passes a mix of homes and businesses. At the Seventh Avenue intersection, the Red Belt ends and the median of the road widens as it comes to a bridge over Norfolk Southern's Conemaugh Line, reaching an eastbound exit and westbound entrance with First Avenue. After this, PA 366 heads onto the George D. Stuart Bridge over the Allegheny River. Upon crossing the river, the route enters the city of New Kensington in Westmoreland County, becoming four-lane undivided Tarentum Bridge Road, passing between residential neighborhoods to the west and businesses to the east. The road continues south and gains a center left-turn lane, running through more commercial areas. PA 366 heads into woods and becomes a three-lane road with one eastbound lane and two westbound lanes, coming to an interchange with PA 56. At this point, PA 366 heads south concurrent with PA 56 on four-lane divided Stevenson Boulevard, curving southwest through more wooded areas before turning south and running to the east of Valley High School. The road comes to an intersection with the western terminus of PA 780 prior to passing a few businesses, with PA 56 splitting to the west. At this point, PA 366 becomes concurrent with PA 56 Truck and turns southwest, running near more homes and businesses as it becomes a two-lane undivided road with frontage roads. The frontage roads end and the route curves south past more commercial establishments. PA 366 merges southeast onto Freeport Street and turns south into the city of Lower Burrell.

At this point, PA 56 Truck turns west onto 2nd Street and PA 366 turns east onto Greensburg Road, heading into wooded areas with some residential and commercial development. The road briefly forms the border between New Kensington to the north and Lower Burrell to the south before fully entering Lower Burrell again as it continues to the north of Pucketa Creek. The route continues southeast through more woodland with homes and businesses, crossing the Pucketa Creek into the borough of Plum in Allegheny County. PA 366 continues past more wooded residential areas, crossing into the borough of Murrysville in Westmoreland County. The road crosses the Pucketa Creek into Upper Burrell Township and continues southeast. The route widens into a four-lane divided highway and turns south, heading back into Murrysville and heading through woods, curving southeast to come to an interchange with PA 380. Past this, PA 366 heads into Washington Township and runs through more woodland with some homes, curving to the east-southeast. The route heads to the east as it enters a mix of farm fields and woods with a few residences, ending at an intersection with PA 66.

== Major intersections ==
County	Location	mi	km	Destinations	Notes
Allegheny	Fawn Township–Tarentum line	0.000	0.000	Red Belt / Bull Creek Road	Continuation beyond western terminus
Allegheny	Fawn Township–Tarentum line	0.000	0.000	PA 28 (Allegheny Valley Expressway) – Pittsburgh, Kittanning	Exit 14 on PA 28, western terminus of PA 366 and its concurrency with the Red Belt
Allegheny	Tarentum	0.793	1.276	Red Belt ends / East 7th Avenue / Freeport Road	Eastern terminus of Red Belt and its concurrency with PA 366
Allegheny	Tarentum	0.893	1.437	First Avenue	Interchange; eastbound exit and westbound left entrance
Allegheny River		0.978	1.574	George D. Stuart Bridge	
Westmoreland	New Kensington	2.893	4.656	PA 56 east – Leechburg	Interchange; left exit; left entrance eastbound; western end of wrong-way concurrency with PA 56
Westmoreland	New Kensington	3.575	5.753	PA 780 east (Powers Drive)	Western terminus of PA 780
Westmoreland	New Kensington	3.702	5.958	PA 56 west (7th Street) / PA 56 Truck – New Kensington, Arnold, Springdale	Eastern end of wrong-way concurrency with PA 56; western end of wrong-way concurrency with PA 56 Truck
Westmoreland	New Kensington–Lower Burrell line	4.563	7.343	PA 56 Truck west (2nd Street) / Orange Belt	Eastern end of wrong-way concurrency with PA 56 Truck
Westmoreland	Murrysville	10.283	16.549	PA 380 – North Washington	Partial interchange
Westmoreland	Washington Township	14.767	23.765	PA 66 – Delmont, Vandergrift	Eastern terminus of PA 366
1.000 mi = 1.609 km; 1.000 km = 0.621 mi: Concurrency terminus; Incomplete access
