= Pennsylvania Route 780 =

State highway in Westmoreland County, Pennsylvania, US

Pennsylvania Route 780

Route information
- Maintained by PennDOT
- Length: 8.49 mi (13.66 km)
- Existed: 1936–present

Major junctions
- West end: PA 56 / PA 366 in New Kensington
- East end: PA 380 in Washington Township

Location
- Country: United States
- State: Pennsylvania
- Counties: Westmoreland

Highway system
- Pennsylvania State Route System; Interstate; US; State; Scenic; Legislative
← PA 772	→ PA 790

Pennsylvania Route 780 (PA 780) is an 8.49-mile-long (13.66 km) state highway located in Westmoreland County, Pennsylvania. The western terminus is at PA 56/PA 366 in New Kensington. The eastern terminus is at PA 380 in Washington Township.

Unusually, PA 780 was used for two separate state highways for more than three decades, with a different route of the same number existing in Clinton County. That route was decommissioned in 1967.

== Route description ==
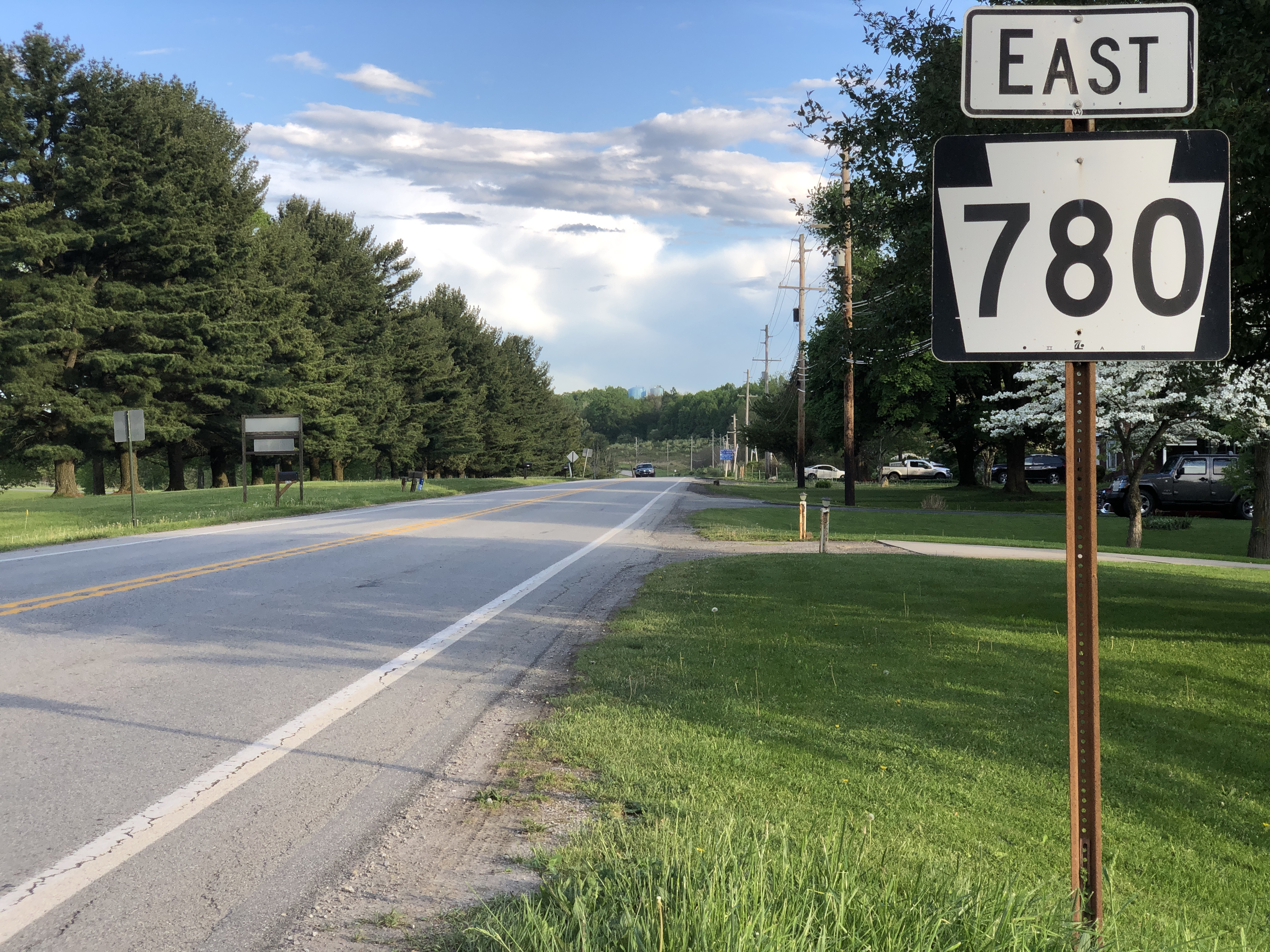
PA 780 eastbound in Upper Burrell Township

PA 780 begins at an intersection with PA 56/PA 366 in the city of New Kensington, heading east on two-lane undivided Powers Drive. The route passes through wooded areas with some residential and commercial development, turning northeast onto 7th Street. The road winds east through more woodland with development, crossing into the city of Lower Burrell and becoming 7th Street Road. PA 780 heads east past more wooded areas of homes before winding south through a mix of fields and woods with some residences. The route curves east and enters Upper Burrell Township, passing by the Penn State New Kensington university campus before continuing through forested areas with occasional residential development. The road curves southeast and runs near the Alcoa Technical Center before passing through the community of Alcoa Center. PA 780 passes through more forests as it heads into Washington Township and becomes North Washington Road, reaching its eastern terminus at PA 380.

== Major intersections ==
The entire route is in Westmoreland County.

Location	mi	km	Destinations	Notes
New Kensington	0.00	0.00	PA 56 / PA 366 (Stevenson Boulevard) – New Kensington, Vandergrift	Western terminus
Washington Township	8.49	13.66	PA 380 – Camp Jo-Ann, North Washington	Eastern terminus
1.000 mi = 1.609 km; 1.000 km = 0.621 mi
