= Disillusion =

Disillusion or Disillusioned may refer to:

== Music ==
- Disillusion (band), a German progressive metal band
- Disillusion (album), a 1984 album by Japanese heavy metal band Loudness
- Disillusioned, an album by Rex Ilusivii

=== Songs ===
- "Disillusion" (song), by ABBA
- "Disillusion", a single by Sachi Tainaka
- "Disillusion", second part of the song "Starship Trooper" by Yes
- "Disillusioned", by A Perfect Circle 2017
- "Disillusioned", by Oliver Nelson from Afro/American Sketches 1961
- "Disillusioned", by New Zealand band Atlas from Reasons for Voyaging 2007
- "Disillusioned", by Daniel Caesar from Never Enough

== Other uses ==
- "Disillusion" (Upstairs, Downstairs), a 1975 episode of the TV series Upstairs, Downstairs
- Disillusioned (book), a 2024 book by Benjamin Herold
