= Penn Hills High School =

Coordinates: 40.4674°N 79.8173°W

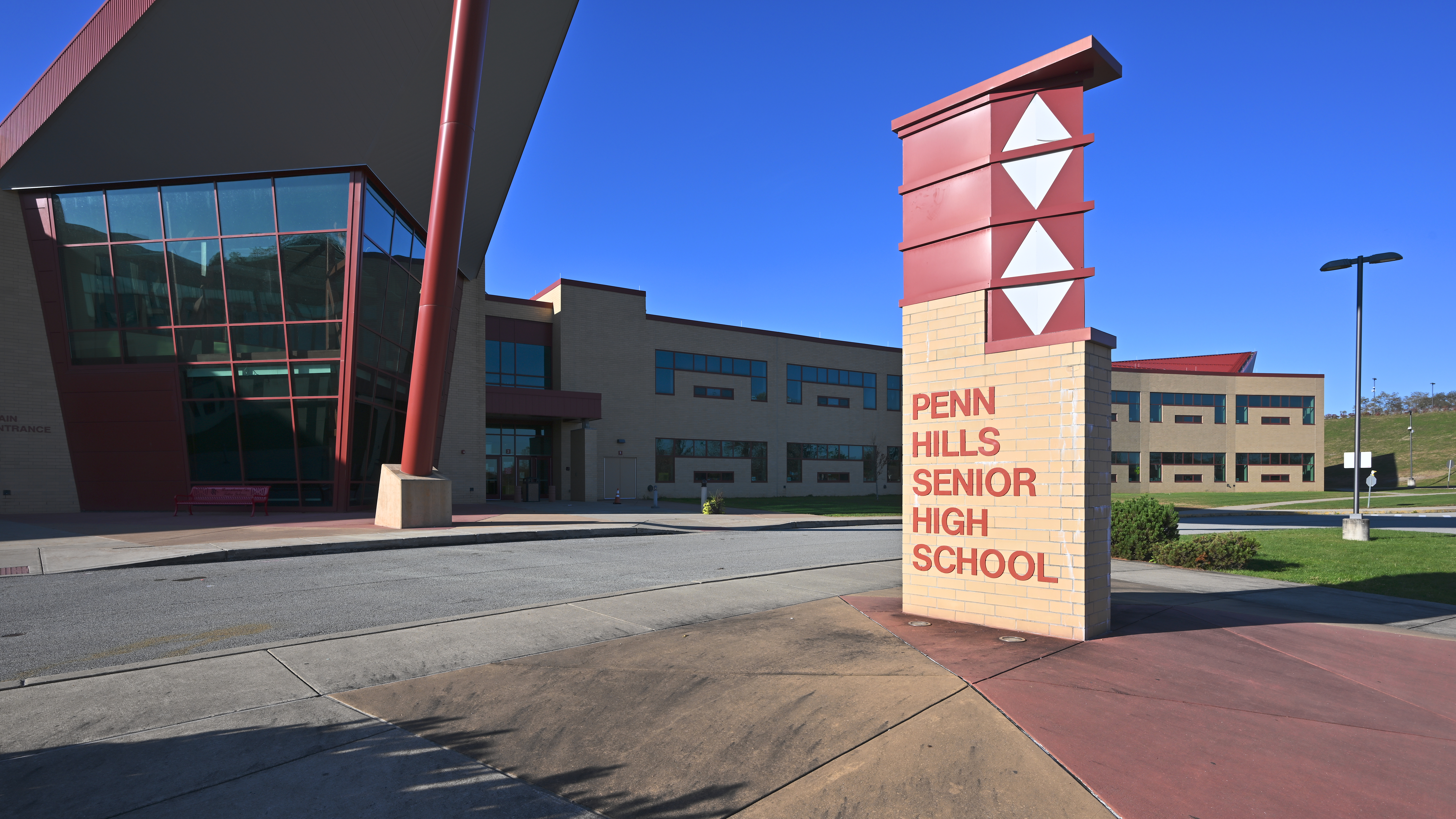

Location
- 309 Collins Drive; Pittsburgh, Pennsylvania, 15235; United States

Information
- School district: Penn Hills School District
- Principal: Bernard Taylor Jr.
- Teaching staff: 56.00 (on an FTE basis)
- Grades: 9th through 12th
- Enrollment: 1,049 (2024–2025)
- Student to teacher ratio: 18.73
- Colors: Red and gold
- Feeder schools: Linton Middle School & Penn Hills Elementary School
- Website: phhs.phsd.org

Penn Hills High School is a public secondary school located in Penn Hills, east of Pittsburgh, Pennsylvania, United States. It is the sole high school operated by the Penn Hills School District. In the 2025–26 school year, enrollment was reported as 1,049 students in 9th through 12th grades.

== Building ==
The new $58 million Penn Hills High School building was opened on January 3, 2013. The school was designed by Architectural Innovations. There are two gymnasiums, with the main one seating 1,900. The auditorium has about 1,000 seats with state-of-the-art lighting and sound-systems. All classrooms include Promethean World interactive whiteboards. The building features large skylights that can be seen from both the top and bottom floors to promote natural lighting. The school's new HVAC system was expected to save 30 percent in energy costs.

Because the enrollment was decreasing at the time, Benjamin Herod, the author of Disillusioned: Five Families and the Unraveling of America's Suburbs, criticized the decision to build the new school.

In 2012, the Pittsburgh Steelers funded a new $200,000 football field for the school.

== Extracurriculars ==
The students have access to a wide variety of clubs, activities and an extensive sports program.

The Penn Hills Marching Band travels to football games and marches in a variety of parades throughout the year. Every year they return to Kennywood to perform, and take another trip out-of-state. Past band trips include Walt Disney World, Chicago, and Six Flags. The school also produces Gene Kelly Awards winning musicals and two plays per year. The school also has a after school program called "Safe Spaces," giving students the opportunity to have a relaxed and secure place to go to after school.

=== Sports ===
The teams are referred to as just Penn Hills no longer going by their previous name "Indians", and the student cheering section is known as the Tribe. The Steelers recently supported and funded the school for new turf at the Yuhas McGinley Stadium.

The district funds:

Varsity

Boys

- Baseball - 5A
- Basketball- 5A
- Cross Country - AAA
- Football - 5A
- Golf - AAA
- Soccer - AAA
- Swimming and Diving - AAA
- Track and Field - AAA
- Volleyball - AAA
- Wrestling - AAA

Girls

- Basketball - AAAA
- Cross Country - AAA
- Golf - AAA
- Soccer (Fall) - AAA
- Softball - AAAA
- Swimming and Diving - AAA
- Girls' Tennis - AAA
- Track and Field - AAA
- Volleyball - AAA

According to PIAA directory January 2016

== Notable alumni ==
- Dante Cephas – college football player for the Kansas State Wildcats
- Barry Church – professional football player in the National Football League (NFL)
- Aaron Donald – retired professional football player in the NFL and 3x Defensive Player of the Year
- Jaden Dugger – professional football player in the NFL
- Scott Edgar – college basketball coach
- Tom Flynn – professional football player in the NFL
- Bill Fralic – professional football player in the NFL
- Bill Fulton – professional baseball player
- Kevin Peter Hall – actor
- Daequan Hardy – college football player declaring for the 2024 NFL draft.
- Treyvon Hester – professional football player in the NFL
- George Karl – college basketball player; professional basketball player and head coach in the National Basketball Association (NBA)
- Abby Lee Miller – reality TV star
- Anthony Morelli – professional football player in the NFL and Arena Football League; college football player at Penn State
- Guy Primus – businessman and entrepreneur
- Salima Rockwell – volleyball head coach for the Notre Dame Fighting Irish
- Jake Schifino – professional football player in the NFL
- Herb Sendek – college basketball head coach
- Raion Strader – college football player for the Pittsburgh Panthers
- Tom Tumulty – professional football player in the NFL
- Damon Young – writer

Penn Hills Sports Hall of Fame Official Website: HOME | Penn Hills Sports Hall of Fame

== District ==
Penn Hills School District entered Pennsylvania's state-mandated Financial Recovery program in 2019 after several years of overspending and a rapidly increasing debt load. After implementing a multi-year recovery plan focused on stabilizing its fund balance, reducing long-term debt, and improving financial oversight, the district made significant progress. On May 23, 2024, the Pennsylvania Department of Education officially announced that Penn Hills had exited Financial Recovery status, noting improvements such as a strengthened fund balance, reduced reliance on short-term borrowing, and more sustainable budgeting practices. The district will continue under a five-year monitoring period to ensure ongoing financial stability.
