= Pennsylvania Route 790 =

Former state highway in Pennsylvania, United States

Pennsylvania Route 790
- PA 790 highlighted in red

Route information
- Maintained by Pennsylvania Department of Highways
- Length: 1.62 mi (2.61 km)
- Existed: 1930–1946

Major junctions
- South end: PA 290 south of Hemlock Grove
- North end: PA 507 in Greentown

Location
- Country: United States
- State: Pennsylvania
- Counties: Pike

Highway system
- Pennsylvania State Route System; Interstate; US; State; Scenic; Legislative
← PA 780	→ PA 791

Pennsylvania Route 790 was a state highway in the county of Pike in Pennsylvania, USA. The highway's southern terminus was at State Route 290 south of Hemlock Grove. The highway progressed northward along Hemlock Grove Road, passing through Hemlock Grove and into Greentown, where it terminated at an intersection with State Route 507. The highway was assigned in 1930 and decommissioned in the 1946 removal of state highways.

== Route description ==
Note: This route description is written as the highway that currently runs along this alignment.

State Route 790 began at an intersection with State Route 290 about 1 mile (1.6 km) south of Hemlock Grove. (The current southern terminus is now State Route 447.) The highway currently progresses to the northeast, intersecting with the dead-end Log Cabin Road, and Liberty Lane, another dead-end road. After Liberty Lane, the former alignment of State Route 790 heads through a line of trees that parallel the highway. There is a short clearing, but this reverses itself before the intersection with Roemerville Road. At Turkey Run Road, there are some more houses, as the highway enters the southern limits of Hemlock Grove.

In Hemlock Grove, the old alignment intersected with Valleyview Road, a short loop road in the community. There is some development surrounding the tree line, with minor highways intersecting. At Running Bear Lane, the road leaves Hemlock Grove and into Greentown, which is populated by trees. The highway crosses a creek that flows into Lake Wallenpaupack, intersecting with a similarly named highway just after. The northern terminus is with Brink Hill Road before the alignment of former State Route 790 at State Route 507 (Lake Wallenpaupack Road) in Greentown.

== History ==
Along with some of the routes in Pennsylvania, State Route 790 was not assigned in the mass numbering of highways in 1928. State Route 790 was assigned along Hemlock Grove Road in 1930, running from State Route 290 to State Route 507. The highway remained intact for over a decade, as the Pennsylvania Department of Highways decommissioned State Route 790 in 1946. That year, the department had decommissioned a number of state routes around the commonwealth. The highway was turned over to local control, and the State Route 790 designation was removed. In 1964, eighteen years after State Route 790 was decommissioned, the southern terminus, State Route 290 was replaced by State Route 447.

== Major intersections ==
The entire route is in Pike County.

Location	mi	km	Destinations	Notes
Hemlock Grove	0.00	0.00	PA 290	
Greentown	1.67	2.69	PA 507	
1.000 mi = 1.609 km; 1.000 km = 0.621 mi

== See also ==
- Pennsylvania Route 447
- Pennsylvania Route 962
