= Penn Hills, Pennsylvania =

Township in Pennsylvania, US

- Home rule township
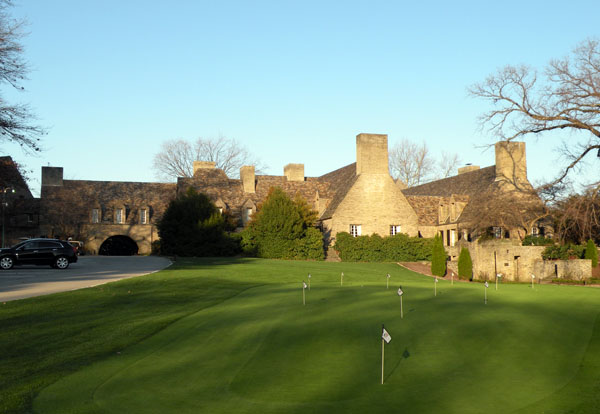
- Longue Vue Club and Golf Course, founded in 1920

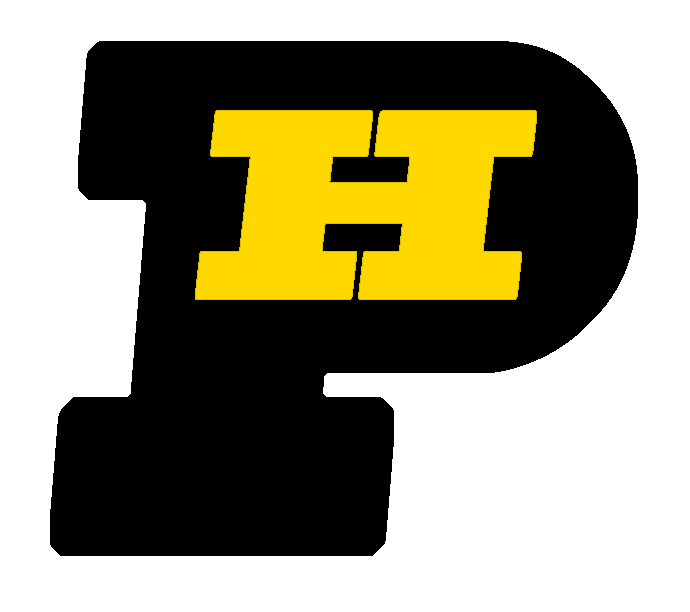
- Seal
- Motto: "A Home Rule Community"
- Interactive map of Penn Hills, Pennsylvania
- Location within Pennsylvania Location within the United States
- Coordinates: 40°28′34″N 79°50′0″W
- Country: United States
- State: Pennsylvania
- County: Allegheny
- Incorporated: 1850

Government
  - Type: Home Rule Municipality

Area
  - Total: 19.36 sq mi (50.13 km^{2})
  - Land: 19.12 sq mi (49.52 km^{2})
  - Water: 0.24 sq mi (0.62 km^{2})

Population (2010)
  - Total: 42,329
  - Estimate (2018): 40,974
  - Density: 2,173.6/sq mi (839.24/km^{2})
- Time zone: UTC−5 (Eastern (EST))
  - Summer (DST): UTC−4 (EDT)
- ZIP Code: 15235
- Area codes: 412, 878
- FIPS code: 42-003-59032
- Website: https://pennhillspa.gov/

Penn Hills is a township with home rule status in Allegheny County, Pennsylvania, United States. The population was 41,059 as of the 2020 census. A suburb of Pittsburgh, Penn Hills is the second-largest municipality in Allegheny County.

== History ==
In 1788, when Allegheny County was formed, the area now known as Penn Hills was part of Pitt Township. On January 16, 1850, Robert Logan, Thomas Davison and Daniel Bieber were appointed by the court to review the boundaries of a new township to be formed from the northern part of Wilkins. This new township was formed and named Adams, until August 1850 when the action of the court was reconsidered to change the name to McNair Township. The name was again changed to Penn Township by Act of Assembly and approved on February 10, 1851. In 1958 Penn Township became Penn Hills Township, and in 1976 Penn Hills became a home rule municipality. The earliest population was given in 1860, when there were 1,821 people living in Penn Township. The population grew to 2,685 in 1870 and 3,291 in 1880.

== Geography ==
Penn Hills is located at 40°28′34″N 79°50′0″W (40.476218, -79.833302). According to the U.S. Census Bureau, the township has a total area of 19.3 square miles (50 km^{2}), of which 19.0 square miles (49 km^{2}) is land and 0.3 square miles (0.78 km^{2}), or 1.40%, is water. Penn Hills uses the ZIP codes of 15235 and 15147; and the community is within area codes 412 and 878.

=== Communities ===
Neighborhoods within Penn Hills include Blackridge, Churchill Valley, Crescent Hills, Eastmont, Eastvue, Laketon Heights, Lincoln Park, Milltown, Nadine, Newfield, North Bessemer, Penn Ridge, Point Breeze, Rosedale, Sandy Creek, Shannon Heights, Universal, Valemont Heights, Gascola, Shadow Shuttle, Frankstown West, Frankstown Estates, Eastwood, and Verona Hilltop.

=== Streams ===
Penn Hills is bordered to the north by the Allegheny River. In addition, the waterways listed below flow through the Municipality:

- Plum Creek flows through the Municipality, creating the border with Plum Borough. The stream passes by North Bessemer Field, Milltown Community Park and Penn Hills Community Park before briefly entering into Oakmont and emptying into the Allegheny River.
- Sandy Creek starts near the intersection of Verona Road and Graham Boulevard Extension and parallels Verona Road to its intersection with Sandy Creek Road where the stream turns and follows the road until it empties into the Allegheny River.
- Thompson Run begins near Linton Middle School and runs along Stotler Road, Frey Road and Thompson Run Road where it forms the Municipality's border with Monroeville. It eventually flows into the Monongahela River.
- Quigley Run forms near the Green Oaks Country Club and passes under Allegheny River Boulevard (PA 130) before directly emptying into the Allegheny River.
- Shades Run, in the Lincoln Park neighborhood, begins off of Tyler Road and flows under Lincoln Road, forming the Municipality's border with the City of Pittsburgh. It crosses under Allegheny River Boulevard (PA 130) before directly emptying into the Allegheny River.
- Duffs Run begins along Long Road in the Churchill Valley neighborhood before winding through the former Churchill Valley Country Club and running into Churchill and Wilkins Township before joining Thompson Run.

=== Surrounding communities ===
Penn Hills has ten land borders, including Verona and Oakmont to the north, Plum Borough to the east and northeast, Monroeville to the southeast, Wilkins Township, Churchill and Wilkinsburg to the south and the Pittsburgh neighborhoods of East Hills to the south, Homewood North to the southwest and Lincoln–Lemington–Belmar to the west.

The Allegheny River borders Penn Hills to the northwest with two neighborhoods running adjacent across the way: O'Hara Township and the borough of Blawnox.

== Demographics ==
Historical population
Census	Pop.	Note	%±
1860	1,821		—
1870	2,685		47.4%
1880	3,291		22.6%
1890	2,932		−10.9%
1900	3,407		16.2%
1910	6,207		82.2%
1920	8,342		34.4%
1930	13,337		59.9%
1940	15,578		16.8%
1950	25,280		62.3%
1960	51,512		103.8%
1970	62,886		22.1%
1980	57,632		−8.4%
1990	51,479		−10.7%
2000	46,809		−9.1%
2010	42,329		−9.6%
2020	41,059		−3.0%

As of the census of 2010, there were 42,329 people living in the township. The population density was 2,268.2 inhabitants per square mile (875.8/km^{2}). There were 20,355 housing units at an average density of 1,069.8 per square mile (413.1/km^{2}). The racial makeup of the township was 60.03% (25,398) White, 37.03% (15,668) African American, 0.98% (409) Asian, 0.01% (4) Pacific Islander, 0.55% from (232) other races. Hispanic or Latino of any race were 1.41% (598) of the population. There is a sizable Italian American population in the township.

There were 19,490 households, out of which 26.3% had children under the age of 18 living with them, 51.1% were married couples living together, 13.5% had a female householder with no husband present, and 31.9% were non-families. 28.2% of all households were made up of individuals, and 13.2% had someone living alone who was 65 years of age or older. The average household size was 2.38 and the average family size was 2.91.

In the township the population was spread out, with 21.7% under the age of 18, 6.3% from 18 to 24, 27.0% from 25 to 44, 25.3% from 45 to 64, and 19.7% who were 65 years of age or older. The median age was 42 years. For every 100 females there were 88.6 males. For every 100 females age 18 and over, there were 84.0 males.

The median income for a household in the township was $39,960, and the median income for a family was $46,971. Males had a median income of $36,143 versus $27,331 for females. The per capita income for the township was $20,161. About 5.6% of families and 7.5% of the population were below the poverty line, including 10.8% of those under age 18 and 6.2% of those age 65 or over.

== Government and politics ==
The Penn Hills Government Center is located at 102 Duff Road. This is the home to all municipal offices, including the Penn Hills Police Department and Penn Hills EMS. All public safety divisions are dispatched by Allegheny County 911.

Presidential Elections Results
Year	Republican	Democratic	Third Parties
2024	27.7% 6,577	70.4% 16,697	--
2020	29% 7,008	69% 16,774	1% 256
2016	31% 6,762	68% 14,919	1% 125
2012	32% 7,017	68% 14,990	0% 199

=== Government/elected officials ===
- Mayor - Pauline Calabrese
- Deputy Mayor - Kimberly Refosco
- Council Member - Ian T. Cartwright
- Council Member - Shawn Kerestus
- Council Member - Alan Waldron
- Controller - Nicholas J. Futules
- Municipal Manager - Diane Gionta Fitzhenry
- Deputy Clerk - Diane Gionta Fitzhenry
- District Justice - Anthony DeLuca Jr.
- US Congress - 17th District - Chris Deluzio
- State Senate - 43rd District - Jay Costa
- US Senate - Casey, Robert P.
- US Senate - John Fetterman
- State House - 32nd District - Joe McAndrew

== Education ==
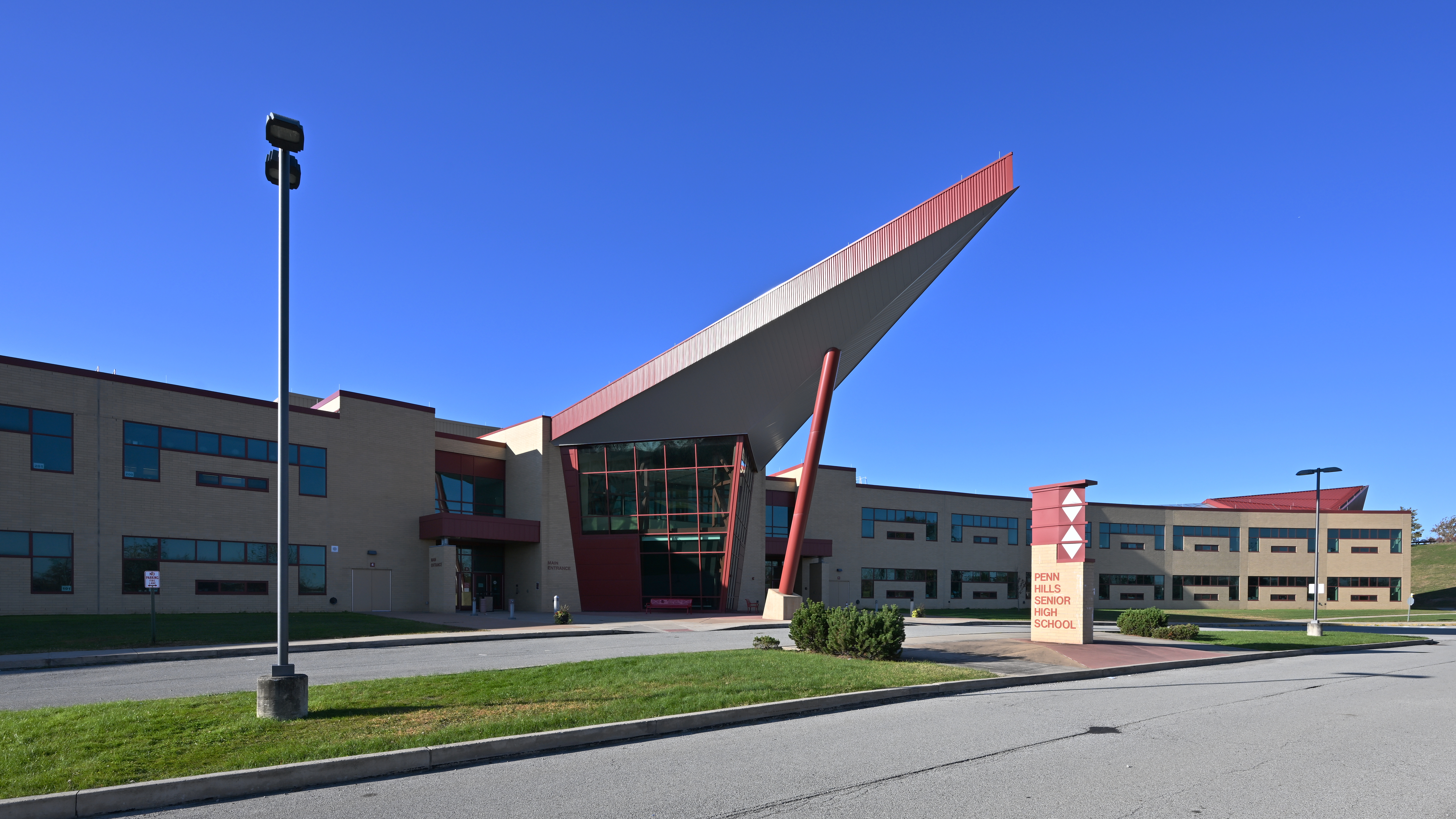
Penn Hills High School

Penn Hills is served by the Penn Hills School District, which includes: Penn Hills Elementary School, Linton Middle School, and Penn Hills High School.

== Transportation ==
Interstate 376 runs through the southernmost part of Penn Hills, linking it and other eastern suburbs to downtown Pittsburgh.

Pennsylvania Route 791, more commonly referred to as Rodi Road, connects heavily traveled Frankstown Road (at PA-791's northern terminus) with I-376 at its southern terminus. Numerous restaurants, fast food locations, stores, gas stations, and hotels can be found on Rodi, as many truckers and travelers using I-376 use the Penn Hills exit to refuel or stay overnight.

For air travel, Pittsburgh International Airport, located in the western portion of the county, is most commonly used. However, the Allegheny County Airport in West Mifflin is also still in use.

Several bus lines of the Port Authority of Allegheny County offer service to Downtown Pittsburgh, and the Port Authority also has several routes and "flyers" located in Penn Hills.

=== Major roads ===
- I-376 / US 22 Penn Lincoln Parkway (Penn Hills is exit 81)
- PA 791 Rodi Road
- PA 380 Frankstown, Saltsburg Roads
- PA 130 Coal Hollow, Sandy Creek, Beulah Roads
- Yellow Belt The Yellow Belt runs through Penn Hills via Hulton, Frankstown, and Rodi Roads
- Green Belt The Green Belt is signed as Robinson Blvd, Verona Road, and Sandy Creek Road within Penn Hills

== Notable people ==
- Paul André Albert, scientist and pioneering metallurgist with Westinghouse
- Dion Bentley, long jumper
- Barry Church, NFL strong safety for the Dallas Cowboys and Jacksonville Jaguars
- Aaron Donald, NFL defensive tackle for the Los Angeles Rams
- Scott Edgar, college basketball coach
- Tom Flynn, NFL safety for the Green Bay Packers and New York Giants
- Bill Fralic, NFL guard for the Atlanta Falcons and Detroit Lions
- Kevin Peter Hall, actor
- George Karl, former NBA player and coach; member of the Basketball Hall of Fame
- Abby Lee Miller, television personality
- Guy Primus, entrepreneur and inventor
- Salima Rockwell, volleyball player
- Tom Tumulty, NFL linebacker for the Cincinnati Bengals

== See also ==
- Blackridge, Pennsylvania
- Penn Hills School District
