= Tom Tumulty =

American football player (born 1973)

No. 53
- Position: Linebacker

Personal information
- Born: February 11, 1973 (age 53); Penn Hills, Pennsylvania, U.S.
- Listed height: 6 ft 3 in (1.91 m)
- Listed weight: 247 lb (112 kg)

Career information
- High school: Penn Hills
- College: Pittsburgh
- NFL draft: 1996: 6th round, 178th overall pick

Career history
- Cincinnati Bengals (1996–1999)

Awards and highlights
- Big East Rookie of the Year (1991)

Career NFL statistics
- Tackles: 104
- Sacks: 1.5
- Forced fumbles: 1
- Stats at Pro Football Reference

Thomas Patrick Tumulty (born February 11, 1973) is an American former professional football player who played linebacker for three seasons for the Cincinnati Bengals, who selected him in the sixth round of the 1996 NFL draft with the 178th overall pick.
