= Penn Hills School District =

School district in Pennsylvania, U.S.

Coordinates: 40.47855°N 79.81773°W

- Map of Allegheny County school districts

Location
- 260 Aster Street, Penn Hills, Pennsylvania, U.S.

District information
- Type: Public
- Motto: Be Part of Something BIGGER
- Grades: Pre-K–12
- Superintendent: Dr. John Mozzocio
- Budget: $87 million (2020-2021)

Students and staff
- Students: 3,360 (2020-2021)
- Staff: 292 teachers (2020-2021)
- District mascot: Indian
- Colors: Red and yellow

Other information
- Website: www.phsd.k12.pa.us

Map of Pennsylvania highlighting Allegheny County

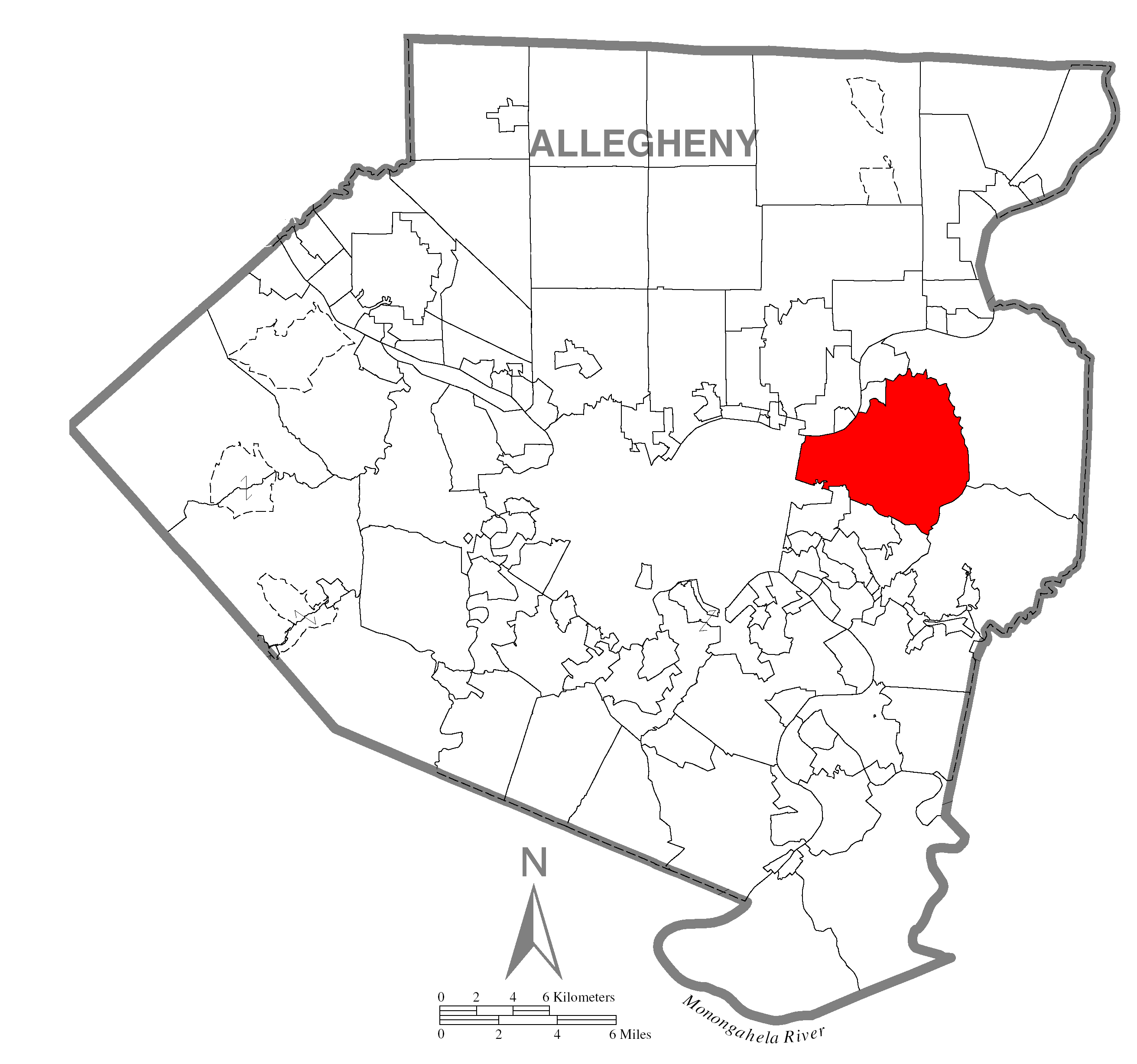
Map of Penn Hills

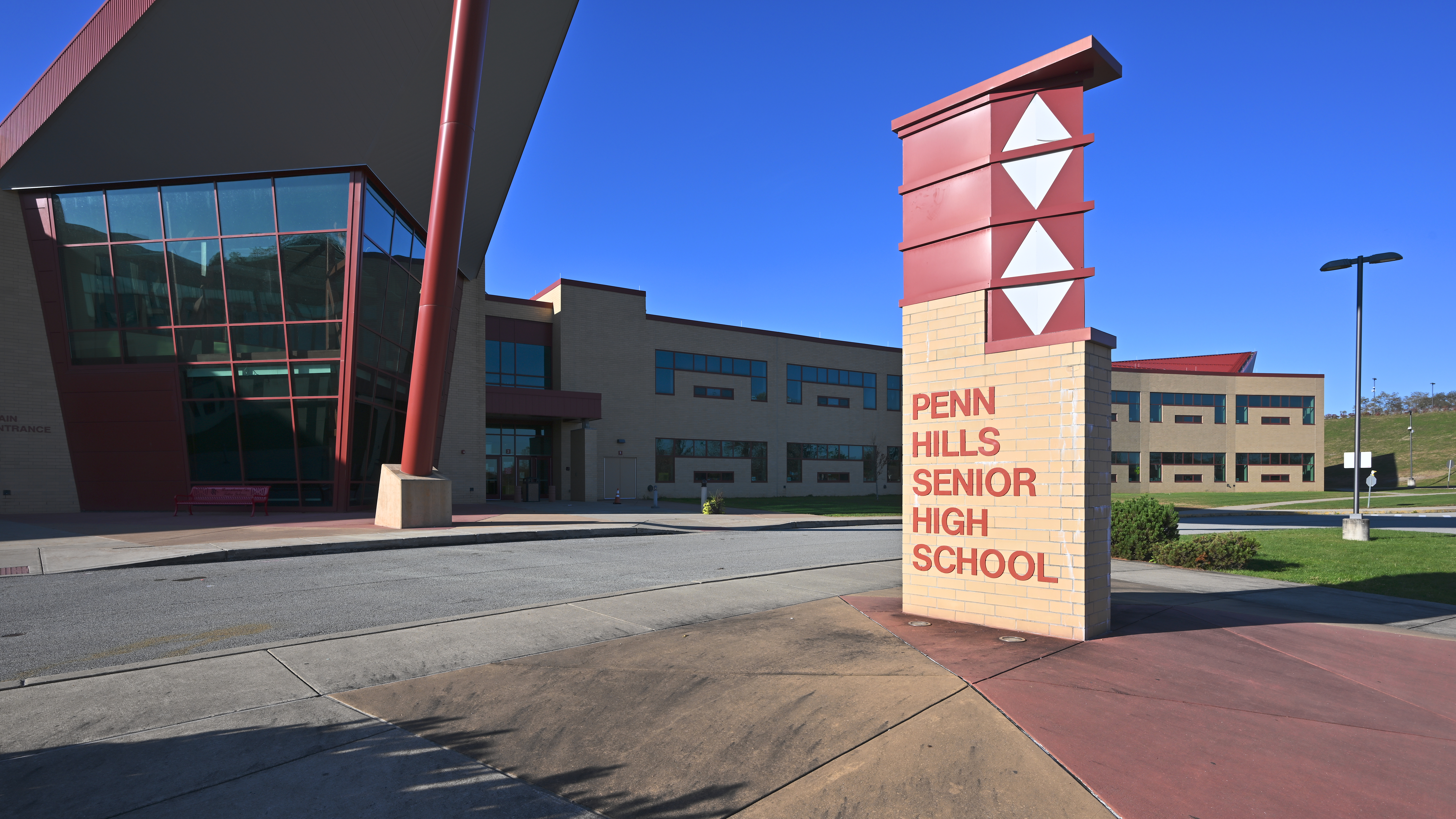
Entrance to Penn Hills Senior High School

Penn Hills School District (PHSD) is a mid-sized public school district located in Pittsburgh, serving Penn Hills, which is about 10 miles (16 km) east of Downtown Pittsburgh, and a small portion of Wilkins Township.

According to 2000 federal census data, it served a resident population of 46,809. By 2010, the district's population declined to 42,431 people. The educational attainment levels for the Penn Hills School District population (25 years old and over) were 91.8% high school graduates and 22.8% college graduates. The district is one of the 500 public school districts of Pennsylvania.

== Current schools ==
- Penn Hills High School
- Linton Middle School
- Penn Hills Elementary School
- Penn Hills Cyber Academy

== Extracurriculars ==
Penn Hills School District offers a variety of clubs, activities and an extensive sports program.

The district funds:

Varsity

Boys

- Baseball - AAAA
- Basketball - AAAA
- Cross country - AAA
- Football - AAAA
- Golf - AAA
- Soccer - AAA
- Swimming and diving - AAA
- Track and field - AAA
- Volleyball - AA
- Wrestling - AA

Girls

- Basketball - AAAA
- Cross country - AAA
- Golf - AAA
- Soccer - AAA
- Softball - AAAA
- Swimming and diving - AAA
- Tennis - AAA
- Track and field - AAA
- Volleyball - AAA

Middle school sports

Boys

- Basketball
- Football
- Soccer
- Swimming and diving
- Track and field
- Wrestling

Girls

- Basketball
- Soccer
- Softball
- Swimming and diving
- Track and field
- Volleyball

According to PIAA directory July 2015

== Former schools ==
- Penn Hills High School, built in 1959 and closed on December 28, 2012, when the new school open on the site of the former Roberts Elementary School which was most recently used as the district's administration building.
- Seneca Junior High, closed and demolished now is the site of UPMC's Seneca Hills Village Independent Living.
- Penn Hebron Elementary, closed at the end of the 2013–2014 school year. This school was originally Penn Junior High. Penn Hebron Elementary Academy was located at 102 Duff Road, Pittsburgh. It provided full-day kindergarten through fourth grade. Penn Hebron Elementary Academy achieved a score of 81 out of 100. The score reflects on grade level: reading, science, writing and mathematics achievement. In 2013–2014, only 63.23% of the students were reading on grade level in grades third through fourth. In third grade, 63.8% of the pupils were reading on grade level. In math, 73.79% were on grade level (3rd-4th grades). In fourth grade science, 70.70% of the pupils demonstrated on grade level understanding.
- Washington Elementary, closed at the end of the 2013–2014 school year.
- Forbes Elementary, closed at the end of the 2013–2014 school year. Forbes Elementary School was located at 5785 Saltsburg Road, Verona. It provided kindergarten through third grade. Forbes Elementary School achieved a score of 64.7 out of 100. The score reflects on grade level: reading, science, writing and mathematics achievement. In third grade, 50% of the pupils were reading on grade level. In math, 55.7% were on grade level (3rd-5th grades).
- Clifford M. Dible Elementary, closed at the end of the 2010–2011 school year and the building was demolished to make way for the new Penn Hills Elementary building.
- Shenandoah Elementary, closed at the end of the 2007–2008 school year.
- William Penn Elementary, closed at the end of the 2007–2008 school year.
- Roberts Elementary School, closed and later demolished to make way for the new Penn Hill Senior High School.
- William McKinley Elementary School, closed and now a Senior Citizens Center.
- Hebron Elementary School, closed in the 1980s after a fire and now part of an industrial park.
- Morrow Elementary School, closed in 1974 and now is part of the Penn Hills Senior Citizen Center on Jefferson Road.
- Ben Franklin School, closed in 1975
- Thaddeus Stevens School, closed in 1979
- Davidson School, closed in the 1980s and was one of the smallest and oldest schools
- Lincoln Park School, closed and is now the Lincoln Park Community Center.

== Other facilities ==
- PHSD Roberts Administration Building, closed and demolished for new high school
- PHSD Transportation Dept./Bus Garage, buses are now outsourced
- Fralic Sports/Athletic Center
