= Wilkins Township, Pennsylvania =

Township in Pennsylvania, US

Wilkins Township
- Township
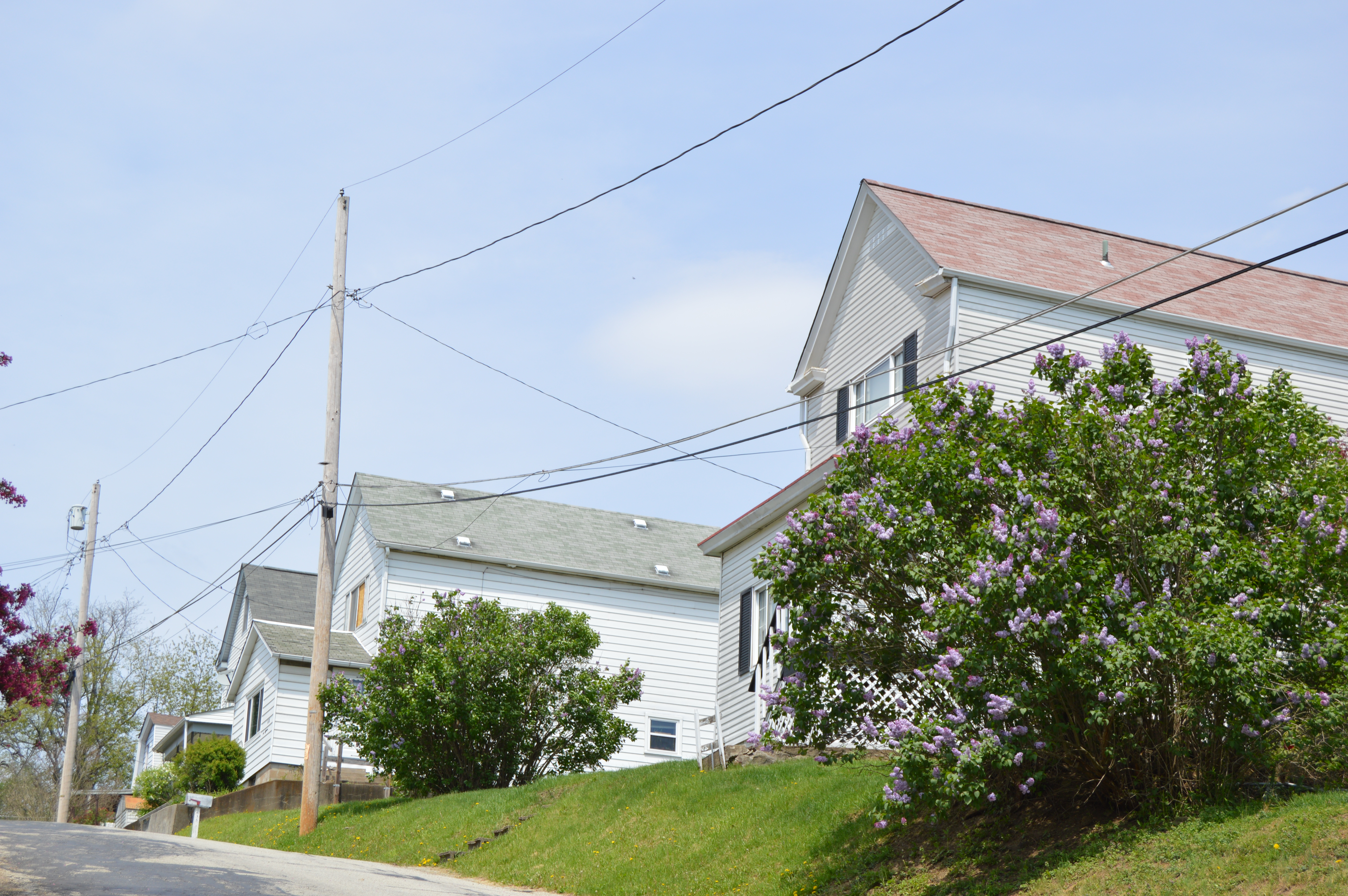
- Houses on Beaver Avenue

- Location in Allegheny County and state of Pennsylvania
- Coordinates: 40°25′22″N 79°49′25″W
- Country: United States
- State: Pennsylvania
- County: Allegheny
- Incorporated: November 10, 1821

Government
  - Council President: Sylvia Martinelli (D)

Area
  - Total: 2.75 sq mi (7.11 km^{2})
  - Land: 2.75 sq mi (7.11 km^{2})
  - Water: 0 sq mi (0.00 km^{2})

Population (2010)
  - Total: 6,357
  - Estimate (2018): 6,161
  - Density: 2,273.7/sq mi (877.89/km^{2})
- Time zone: UTC-5 (Eastern (EST))
  - Summer (DST): UTC-4 (EDT)
- ZIP Codes: 15145, 15235
- FIPS code: 42-003-85184

Wilkins Township is a township in Allegheny County, Pennsylvania, United States. The population was 6,357 at the 2010 census. It is served by Pennsylvania's 12th congressional district, the 43rd District of the Pennsylvania State Senate, and the 34th District of the Pennsylvania State House of Representatives.

Wilkins Township was named for William Wilkins (1779–1865), a politician from Pennsylvania who served in both houses of Congress and as U.S. Secretary of War.

== History ==
The township was created from the eastern part of Pitt Township on November 10, 1821. Its territory originally stretched between the Allegheny and Monongahela rivers; from it sprang most of the municipalities between Pittsburgh on the west and Plum and Monroeville on the east.

== Geography ==
Wilkins Township is located at 40°25′21″N 79°49′24″W (40.422668, -79.823491). According to the United States Census Bureau, the township has a total area of 2.6 square miles (6.8 km^{2}), all land.

=== Watershed ===
The southeastern border of the township is denoted by Thompson Run, a tributary of Turtle Creek. The township is drained by Thompson Run and its tributaries Sawmill Run and Chalfant Run, which in turn has a tributary, Lougeay Run, which flows into the township from Penn Hills. The entire township lies within the Turtle Creek Watershed.

=== Transportation ===
Interstate 376 passes through the northern limb of the township, where it has an exit just as it enters eastbound from Churchill Borough, number 81 onto PA 791/Rodi Road/Yellow Belt northbound into Penn Hills. The business spur of U.S. Route 22 enters eastbound from Churchill, and is where the main commercial section of Wilkins township is located, including the Penn Center East shopping center. US Business 22 crosses Thompson Run from Wilkins Township to Monroeville over the Hall Station Bridge. PA 130 serves the southern portion of the township. The Union Railroad, following the Thompson Run valley, passes through the eastern fringe of the township.

== Surrounding neighborhoods ==
Wilkins Township has eight borders, including Penn Hills to the north, Monroeville to the east, Turtle Creek to the southeast, East Pittsburgh to the south, North Braddock to the south-southwest, Chalfant to the southwest, Forest Hills to the west and Churchill to the northwest and north-northwest.

== Demographics ==
Historical population
Census	Pop.	Note	%±
1970	8,749		—
1980	8,472		−3.2%
1990	7,585		−10.5%
2000	6,917		−8.8%
2010	6,357		−8.1%
2018 (est.)	6,161		−3.1%
U.S. Decennial Census

As of the census of 2000, there were 6,917 people, 3,235 households, and 2,012 families residing in the township. The population density was 2,637.6 inhabitants per square mile (1,018.4/km^{2}). There were 3,432 housing units at an average density of 1,308.7 per square mile (505.3/km^{2}). The racial makeup of the township was 92.79% White, 4.38% African American, 0.09% Native American, 1.52% Asian, 0.06% Pacific Islander, 0.19% from other races, and 0.98% from two or more races. 0.45% of the population were Hispanic or Latino of any race.

There were 3,235 households, out of which 19.3% had children under the age of 18 living with them, 50.9% were married couples living together, 9.0% had a female householder with no husband present, and 37.8% were non-families. 33.8% of all households were made up of individuals, and 16.6% had someone living alone who was 65 years of age or older. The average household size was 2.14 and the average family size was 2.73.

In the township the population was spread out, with 16.9% under the age of 18, 5.4% from 18 to 24, 25.8% from 25 to 44, 26.1% from 45 to 64, and 25.8% who were 65 years of age or older. The median age was 46 years. For every 100 females there were 89.5 males. For every 100 females age 18 and over, there were 85.6 males.

The median income for a household in the township was $37,439, and the median income for a family was $47,882. Males had a median income of $37,127 versus $31,101 for females. The per capita income for the township was $24,515. About 3.8% of families and 6.4% of the population were below the poverty line, including 7.8% of those under age 18 and 4.3% of those age 65 or over.

== Education ==
Wilkins Township is served by the Woodland Hills School District.

== Government and politics ==
Presidential Elections Results
Year	Republican	Democratic	Third Parties
2024	32% 1,280	65% 2,579	1% 62
2020	34% 1,396	64% 2,584	1% 44
2016	40% 1,404	59% 2,052	1% 50
2012	44% 1,563	55% 1,963	1% 34
