= Pennsylvania Route 380 =

State highway in Pennsylvania, US

Pennsylvania Route 380
- SR 400

Route information
- Maintained by PennDOT
- Length: 32.80 mi (52.79 km)
- Existed: 1928–present

Major junctions
- West end: I-579 in Pittsburgh
- PA 8 in Pittsburgh; PA 130 in Penn Hills; PA 791 / Yellow Belt in Penn Hills; PA 286 in Murrysville; PA 366 in Murrysville; PA 780 in Washington Township; PA 66 in Washington Township; PA 819 in Bell Township
- East end: PA 286 in Bell Township

Location
- Country: United States
- State: Pennsylvania
- Counties: Allegheny, Westmoreland

Highway system
- Pennsylvania State Route System; Interstate; US; State; Scenic; Legislative
← I-380	→ PA 381
← PA 399	SR 400	→ PA 401

Pennsylvania Route 380 (officially, SR 400 because of I-380 elsewhere in Pennsylvania), also known as J.F. Bonetto Memorial Highway and within the city of Pittsburgh Bigelow Boulevard, Baum Boulevard and Frankstown Road, is a 32.80-mile-long (52.8 km) state highway in western portions of the U.S. state of Pennsylvania. The western terminus of the route is at Interstate 579 in downtown Pittsburgh near PPG Paints Arena. The eastern terminus is at Pennsylvania Route 286 in Bell Township, near the hamlet of Wakena.

When it was first assigned in the late 1920s, PA 380 occupied only the portion of its modern alignment between PA 286 in Murrysville and PA 286 west of Saltsburg. It was later extended westward over the former routing of PA 80 to Pittsburgh.

== Route description ==
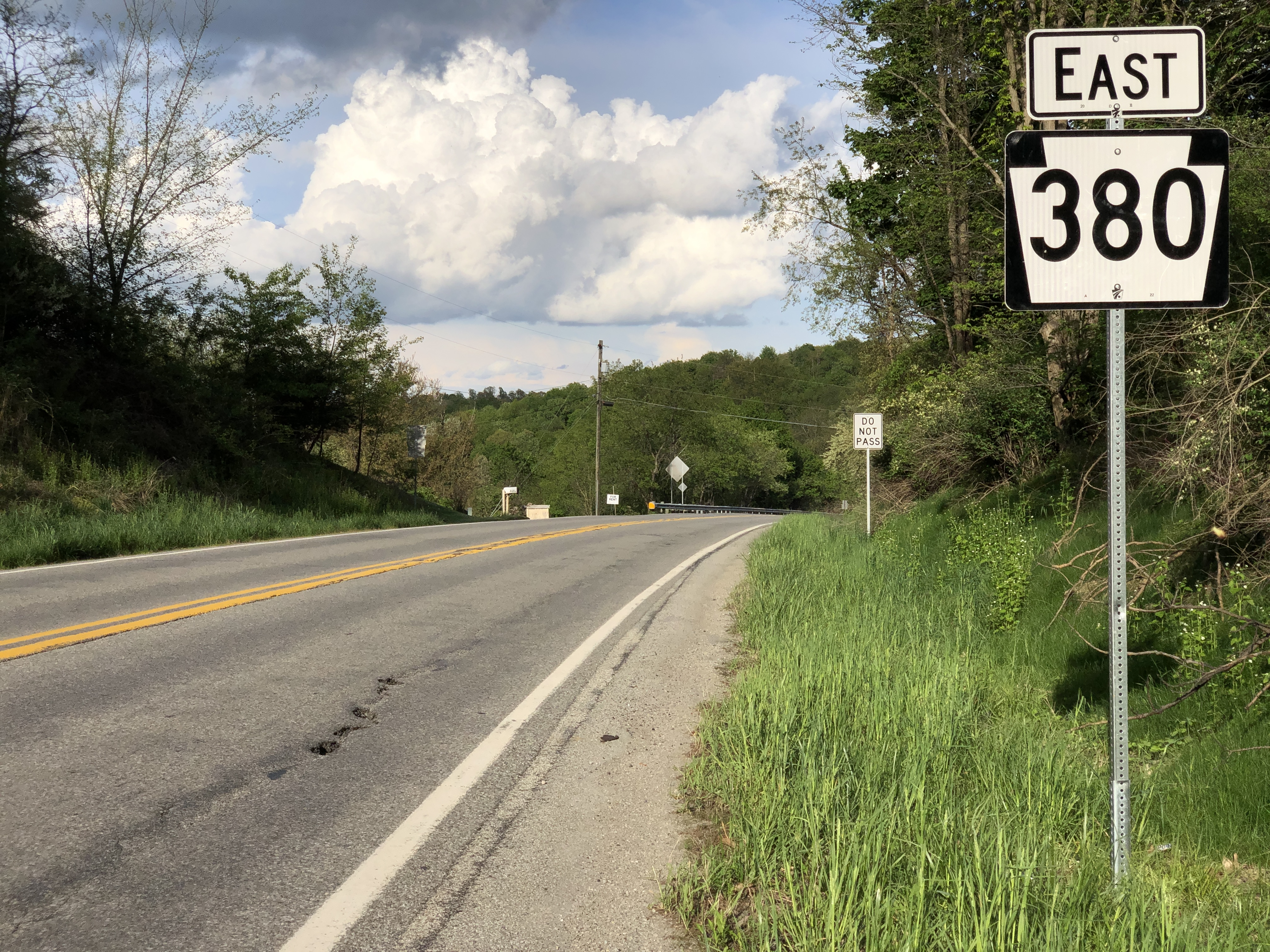
PA 380 eastbound past PA 819 in Bell Township

=== Allegheny County ===
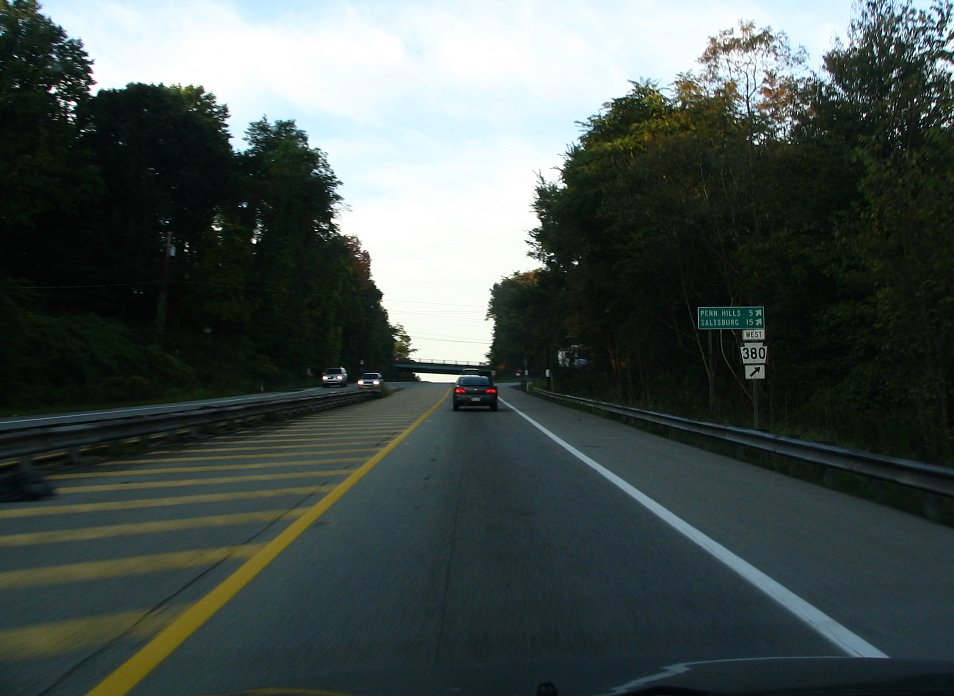
PA 380 / PA 286 junction

PA 380 begins along the ramps of the Bigelow Boulevard and Interstate 579 interchange in Downtown Pittsburgh, north of the former Civic Arena complex. The route proceeds east traversing Ammon Playground park in the Hill District. PA 380 also parallels Norfolk Southern's Pittsburgh Line and the PRT's Martin Luther King Jr. East Busway on this section of the four-lane Bigelow Boulevard. In the neighborhood of Polish Hill, PA 380 intersects the Bloomfield Bridge via eastbound ramp and westbound at-grade intersection; the bridge connects to Liberty Avenue and the Bloomfield neighborhood.

In the North Oakland neighborhood of the city, PA 380 turns east becoming Baum Boulevard. In East Liberty, the route splits into one-way pairs around a large traffic circle known as Penn Circle. PA 380 exits the circle onto Penn Avenue running southeast into the Larimer neighborhood. In Point Breeze, PA 380 overlaps PA 8 for two blocks, from Fifth Avenue to Dallas Avenue; PA 380 turns north onto Dallas Avenue while PA 8 continues on Penn Avenue. In the Homewood South area, PA 380 turns east onto Bennett Street. A few miles east, the route becomes Frankstown Road in East Hills, the easternmost neighborhood in the city Pittsburgh. Frankstown Road leads 380 out of the city and into the eastern suburban area.

In the Penn Hills hamlet of Laketon Heights, the route intersects PA 130. In the hamlet of Rodi, PA 380 meets the northern terminus of PA 791 and begins an overlap with the Yellow Belt. Both routes take a more northern alignment into the northeastern portions of the township. Near the Alcoma Golf Club, PA 380 leaves the Yellow Belt, while turning east onto Saltsburg Road. Roughly east of the Pennsylvania Turnpike overpass in the borough of Plum, PA 380 begins an overlap with the Orange Belt at the intersection with Center Road near Boyce Park. At the New Texas Road junction, the belt turns north and leaves PA 380.

=== Westmoreland County ===
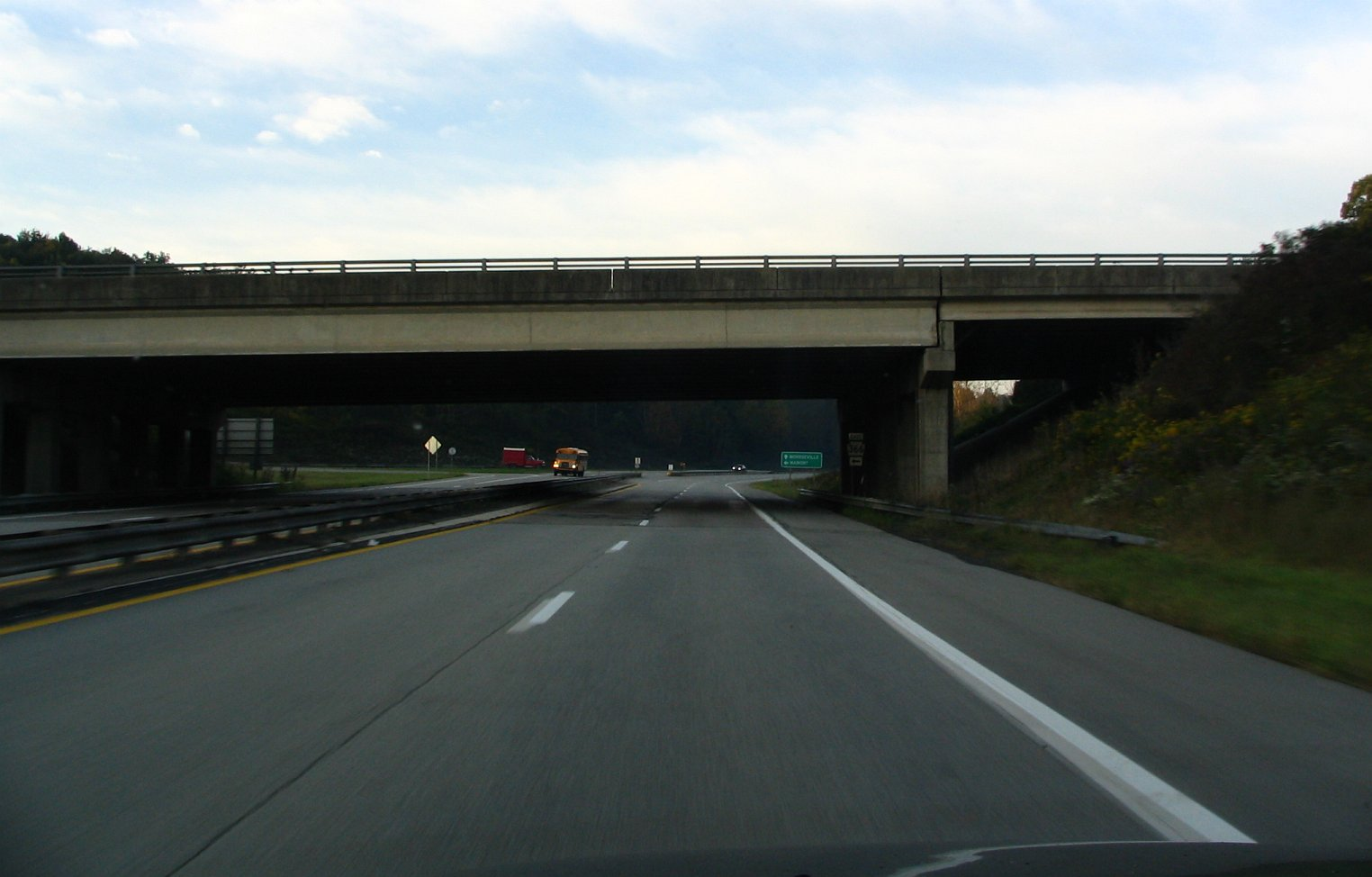
PA 380 / PA 366 junction

As PA 380 enters Westmoreland County, the highway interchanges PA 286. PA 380 then proceeds on a northeast course along the Golden Mile Highway, a multi-lane divided highway with access ramps. Near Rolling Fields Golf Club, PA 380 interchanges PA 366. Past the interchange, the highway continues on its northeast alignment. In the Westmoreland Business Research Park area, PA 380 intersects the eastern terminus of PA 780. The route proceeds eastward to interchange PA 66 in the hamlet of North Washington. East of 66, PA 380 winds its way along the northern banks of the Beaver Run Reservoir and terminates at PA 286, a few miles west of Saltsburg.

== History ==
In the late 1920s and early 1930s, PA 380 was first designated from Pennsylvania Route 80 in Murrysville to the current eastern terminus. From U.S. Route 22 and U.S. Route 30 at the intersection of Dallas and Penn Avenues in Pittsburgh to Murrysville near the Allegheny-Westmoreland County line, PA 380 was signed as PA 80.

By 1940, PA 80 was extended west onto Bigelow Boulevard, Baum Boulevard, and Penn Avenue in Pittsburgh, modern designations of PA 380. By 1960, PA 380 replaced most of PA 80 from Dallas and Penn Avenues in Pittsburgh to Murrysville. On July 15, 1960, PA 380 replaced all of PA 80 from Interstate 479 (now I-579) to Dallas and Penn Avenues. This designation change was made to reduce the number of concurrent routes in Pittsburgh. The changes took effect a few months later and signs were changed by spring 1961. The reason for doing this was because Interstate 80 was created, so PA 80 was removed so there would not be two Route 80s.

== Major intersections ==
County	Location	mi	km	Destinations	Notes
Allegheny	Pittsburgh	0.00	0.00	I-579 south to I-376 east (US 22 east / US 30 east) – Monroeville, Liberty Bridge; 6th Avenue – PPG Arena	Interchange; western terminus
Allegheny	Pittsburgh	5.01	8.06	PA 8 north (Washington Boulevard) / Blue Belt	Western end of PA 8 concurrency
Allegheny	Pittsburgh	5.32	8.56	PA 8 south (Penn Avenue)	Eastern end of PA 8 concurrency
Allegheny	Penn Hills	8.02	12.91	Green Belt (Verona Road / Robinson Boulevard)	
Allegheny	Penn Hills	9.52	15.32	PA 130 (Coal Hollow Road / Beulah Road) to I-376 (US 22)	
Allegheny	Penn Hills	10.72	17.25	PA 791 south / Yellow Belt (Rodi Road)	Northern terminus of PA 791; western end of Yellow Belt concurrency
Allegheny	Penn Hills	12.22	19.67	Yellow Belt (Hulton Road)	Eastern end of Yellow Belt concurrency
Allegheny	Plum	15.82	25.46	Orange Belt (Monroeville Trestle Road) – Monroeville	Western end of Orange Belt concurrency
Allegheny	Plum	17.22	27.71	Orange Belt (New Texas Road)	Eastern end of Orange Belt concurrency
Westmoreland	Murrysville	19.73	31.75	PA 286 (Golden Mile Highway / Saltsburg Road) – Saltsburg	Interchange; PA 286 westbound overlaps PA 380 for less than a block
Westmoreland	Murrysville	20.75	33.39	PA 366 (Greensburg Road) – New Kensington, Mamont	Interchange
Westmoreland	Washington Township	24.25	39.03	PA 780 west (North Washington Road)	Eastern terminus of PA 780
Westmoreland	Washington Township	25.90	41.68	PA 66 – Apollo, Greensburg	Interchange
Westmoreland	Bell Township	30.19	48.59	PA 819	
Westmoreland	Bell Township	32.80	52.79	PA 286 (Waukeena Road / Alcorns Cross Road)	Eastern terminus
1.000 mi = 1.609 km; 1.000 km = 0.621 mi: Concurrency terminus
