= Beulah Presbyterian Church =

Historic church in Pennsylvania, United States

- U.S. National Register of Historic Places
- Pittsburgh Landmark – PHLF
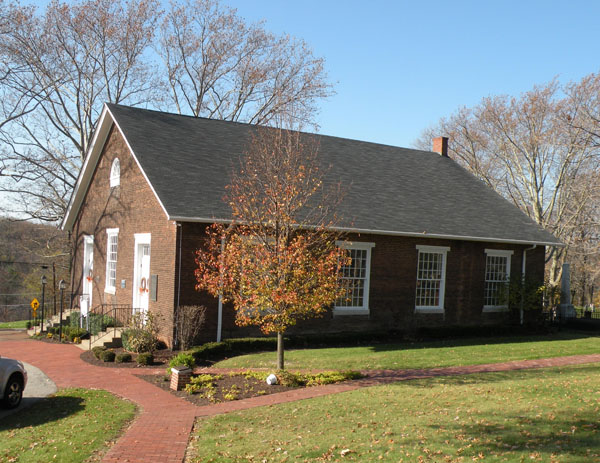

- Location within Pittsburgh Location within Pennsylvania Location within the United States
- Location: Beulah and McCrady Rds., Churchill, Pennsylvania
- Coordinates: 40°26′49″N 79°50′55″W
- Area: 1 acre (0.40 ha)
- Built: 1837
- Architectural style: Georgian
- NRHP reference No.: 75001606

Significant dates
- Added to NRHP: November 03, 1975
- Designated PHLF: 1970

Beulah Presbyterian Church is a historic church at Beulah and McCready Roads in Churchill, Pennsylvania. The hilltop location of the church gave the borough of Churchill its name.

The original church building was constructed around 1837 and added to the National Register of Historic Places in 1975. A newer church building is located on the same grounds.

== See also ==
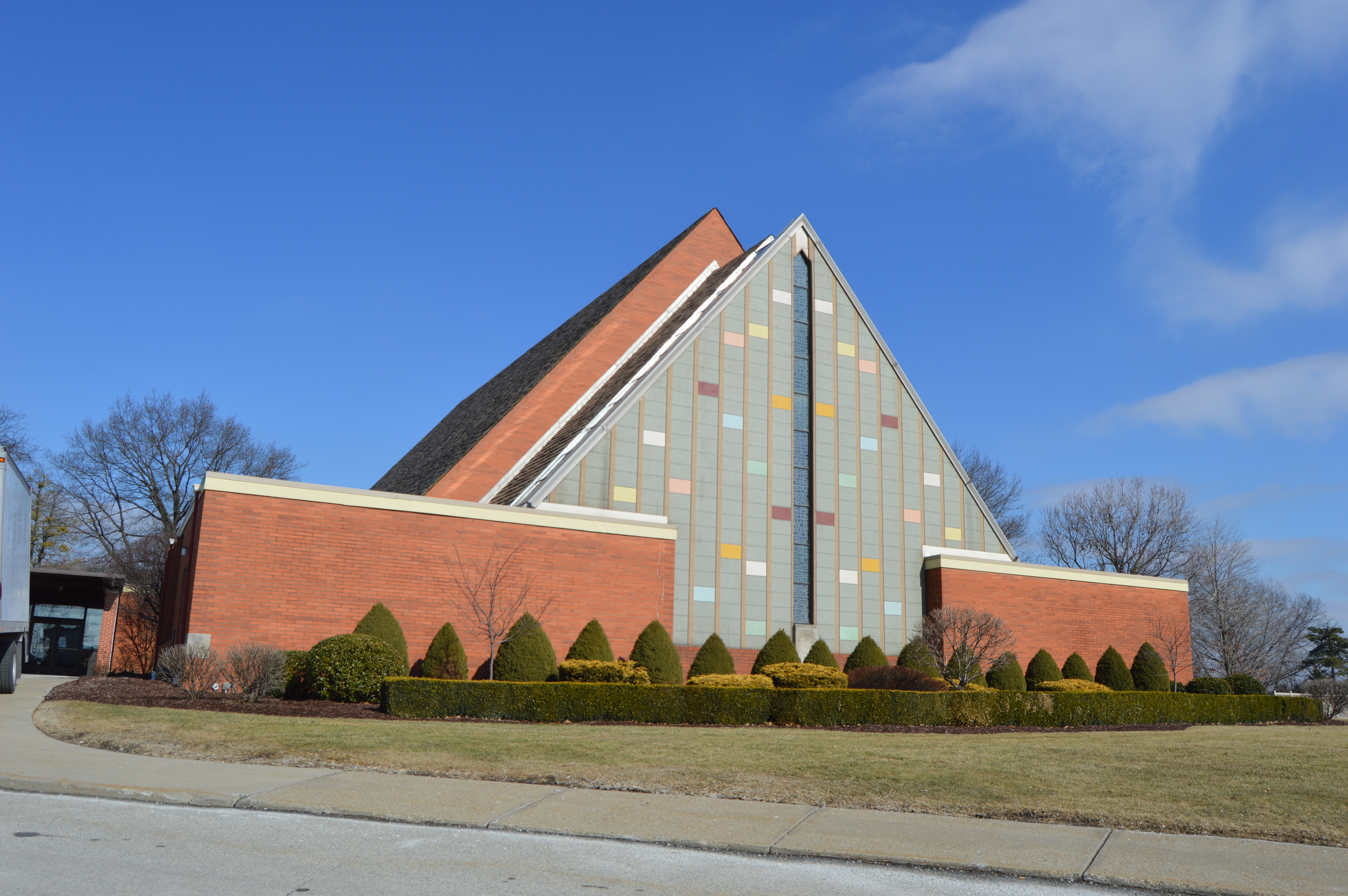
The congregation's current building on the same property

- National Register of Historic Places listings in Allegheny County, Pennsylvania
