= Raion Strader =

American football player (born 2004)

Pittsburgh Panthers
- Position: Cornerback
- Class: Senior

Personal information
- Born: November 14, 2004 (age 21)
- Listed height: 6 ft 0 in (1.83 m)
- Listed weight: 180 lb (82 kg)

Career information
- High school: Penn Hills (Pittsburgh, Pennsylvania)
- College: Miami (OH) (2023–2024); Auburn (2025); Pittsburgh (2026–present)

Awards and highlights
- First-team All-MAC (2024)
- Stats at ESPN

Raion Strader (born November 14, 2004) is an American college football cornerback for the Pittsburgh Panthers. He previously played for the Miami RedHawks and the Auburn Tigers.

== Early life ==
Strader is from Pittsburgh, Pennsylvania. He attended Penn Hills High School, where he played football and was a wrestler. He was the football team captain twice and was also a first-team all-conference selection in both his junior and senior years. He received little attention as a recruit and committed to play college football for the Miami (Ohio) RedHawks.

== College career ==
=== Miami (OH) ===
Strader became a starter as a true freshman for Miami in 2023, starting 12 of 13 games at cornerback while totaling 57 tackles, 13 pass breakups and an interception. He helped Miami record 11 wins while winning the Mid-American Conference (MAC) championship and appearing in the 2023 Cure Bowl. He was named a Freshman All-American by the Football Writers Association of America (FWAA), being the first to receive the honor for Miami since Ben Roethlisberger in 2001.

Strader remained starter in 2024 and helped Miami to another MAC championship appearance. In 2024, he totaled 53 tackles, two interceptions and 18 pass breakups, being the national leader in pass breakups. He was named first-team All-MAC and the MAC Cornerback of the Year for his performance. He entered the NCAA transfer portal after the season, finishing his two-year stint with the RedHawks having totaled 110 tackles and three interceptions.

=== Auburn ===
Strader transferred to the Auburn Tigers for the 2025 season.

On December 4, 2025, Strader announced that he would enter the transfer portal for the second time.

=== Pittsburgh ===
On January 8, 2026, Strader announced that he would transfer to Pittsburgh.
