= George D. Stuart Bridge =

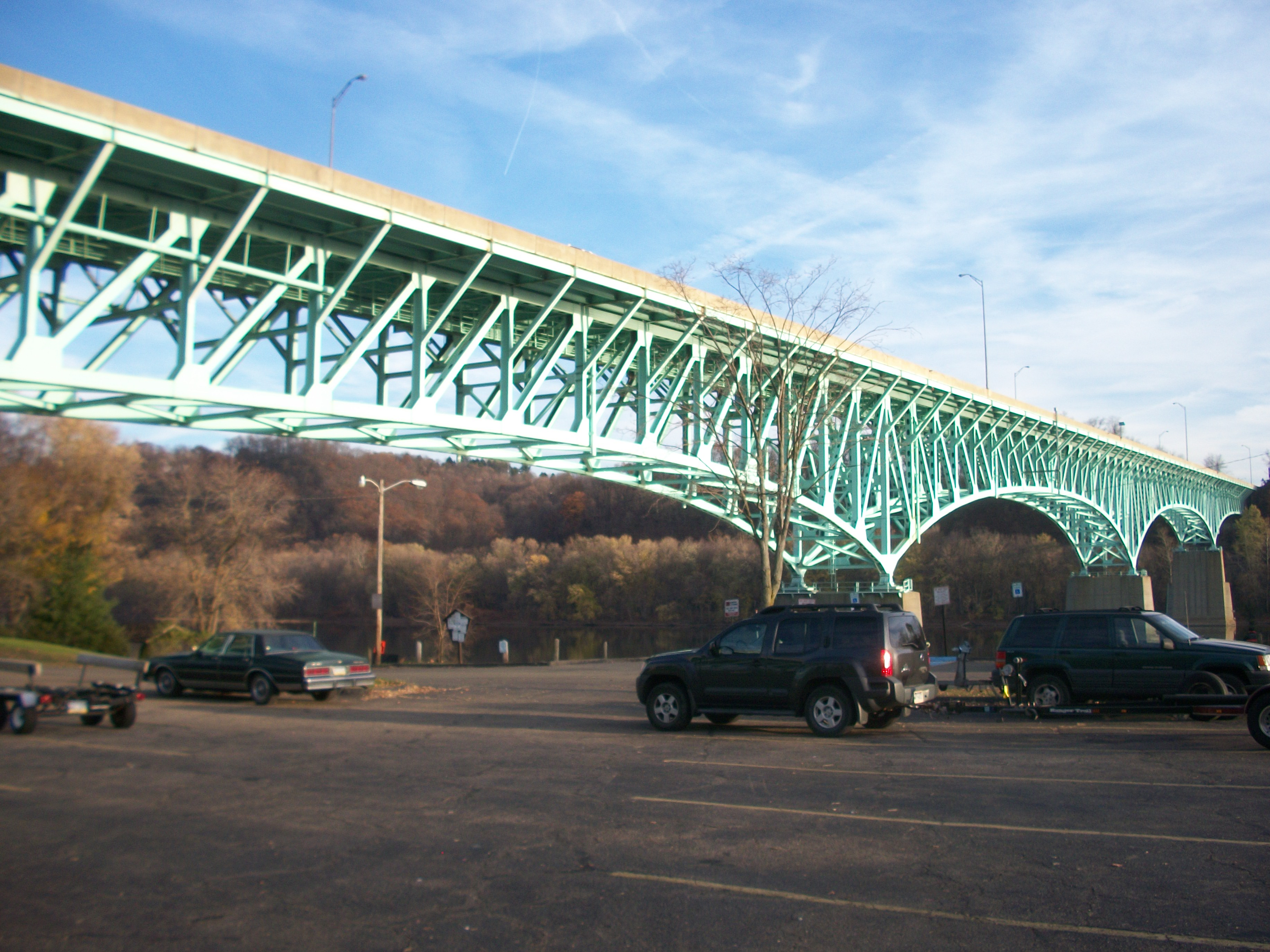
- Coordinates: 40.5969°N 79.7550°W
- Carries: 4 lanes of PA 366
- Crosses: Allegheny River
- Locale: New Kensington and Tarentum
- Other name(s): Tarentum Bridge

Characteristics
- Design: Deck truss bridge
- Longest span: 428.0 feet (130.5 m)
- Clearance below: 47.9 feet (14.6 m)

History
- Opened: 1952

The George D. Stuart Bridge (commonly known as the Tarentum Bridge) is a steel deck truss bridge that carries vehicular traffic across the Allegheny River between New Kensington and Tarentum in the U.S. state of Pennsylvania.

The bridge was officially renamed as the George D. Stuart Bridge in 1974 by the Pennsylvania State Senate in recognition of the World War I and World War II-era and post-war service of George Donnell Stuart in the Pennsylvania House of Representatives.

== History ==
Originally it was named the Tarentum–Valley Heights Bridge. From its opening in 1952 until 1961, its maintenance was supported by a ten-cent toll.

The name of the bridge was changed by the Pennsylvania State Senate in 1974 to honor George Donnell Stuart, a Republican who was elected to the Pennsylvania House of Representatives in 1944 and subsequently reelected in 1946 and 1948. Stuart, who had also been a member of Pennsylvania's Joint Legislative Committee on Mental Health Laws from 1947 to 1948, was a Tarentum High School graduate who had served in the United States Army during World War I and in the United States Army Reserve during World War II prior to his election to the Pennsylvania House. A publication assistant with The Valley Daily News from 1919 to 1920, he had also served as a Justice of the Peace in Brackenridge, Pennsylvania from 1922 to 1925 prior to becoming the editor of the New Kensington newspaper, the Valley News Dispatch, a position he held for half a century, from 1921 to 1971. During his state legislative tenure, he became known for his advocacy for bridge construction along the Allegheny.

== See also ==
- List of crossings of the Allegheny River
