= Churchill, Pennsylvania =

Borough in Pennsylvania, US

- Borough
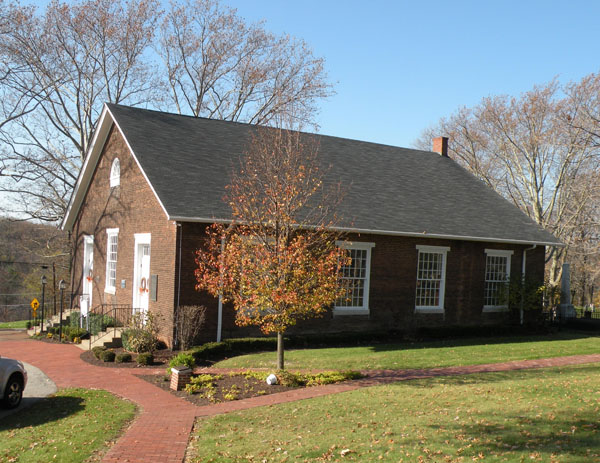
- Beulah Presbyterian Church, built in 1837, and located at Beulah and McCrady Roads in Churchill, PA

- Location in Allegheny County and the U.S. state of Pennsylvania
- Coordinates: 40°26′18″N 79°50′38″W
- Country: United States
- State: Pennsylvania
- County: Allegheny

Government
  - Mayor: Paul Gamrat (D)

Area
  - Total: 2.19 sq mi (5.67 km^{2})
  - Land: 2.19 sq mi (5.67 km^{2})
  - Water: 0 sq mi (0.00 km^{2})

Population (2020)
  - Total: 3,157
  - Density: 1,442.9/sq mi (557.11/km^{2})
- Time zone: UTC-5 (Eastern (EST))
  - Summer (DST): UTC-4 (EDT)
- FIPS code: 42-13608
- Website: churchillborough.com

Churchill is a borough in Allegheny County, Pennsylvania, United States. The population was 3,157 at the 2020 census. It is a residential suburb of the Pittsburgh metropolitan area. The town was named from the hilltop Beulah Presbyterian Church.

== Geography ==
According to the United States Census Bureau, the borough has a total area of 2.2 square miles (5.7 km^{2}), all land.

=== Surrounding neighborhoods ===
Churchill has four borders, including Penn Hills to the north, Wilkins Township to the east and south, Forest Hills to the southwest, and Wilkinsburg to the west

== Demographics ==
Historical population
Census	Pop.	Note	%±
1940	430		—
1950	1,733		303.0%
1960	3,428		97.8%
1970	4,690		36.8%
1980	4,285		−8.6%
1990	3,883		−9.4%
2000	3,566		−8.2%
2010	3,011		−15.6%
2020	3,157		4.8%

=== 2020 census ===
As of the 2020 census, Churchill had a population of 3,157. The median age was 52.5 years. 14.5% of residents were under the age of 18 and 30.3% of residents were 65 years of age or older. For every 100 females there were 94.9 males, and for every 100 females age 18 and over there were 94.2 males age 18 and over.

100.0% of residents lived in urban areas, while 0.0% lived in rural areas.

There were 1,420 households in Churchill, of which 19.7% had children under the age of 18 living in them. Of all households, 54.9% were married-couple households, 14.2% were households with a male householder and no spouse or partner present, and 24.6% were households with a female householder and no spouse or partner present. About 26.8% of all households were made up of individuals and 14.9% had someone living alone who was 65 years of age or older.

There were 1,494 housing units, of which 5.0% were vacant. The homeowner vacancy rate was 2.0% and the rental vacancy rate was 4.7%.

Racial composition as of the 2020 census
Race	Number	Percent
White	2,334	73.9%
Black or African American	526	16.7%
American Indian and Alaska Native	0	0.0%
Asian	85	2.7%
Native Hawaiian and Other Pacific Islander	0	0.0%
Some other race	28	0.9%
Two or more races	184	5.8%
Hispanic or Latino (of any race)	62	2.0%

=== 2000 census ===
As of the 2000 census, there were 3,566 people, 1,519 households, and 1,136 families residing in the borough. The population density was 1,624.3 people per square mile (627.1 people/km^{2}). There were 1,567 housing units at an average density of 713.8 per square mile (275.6/km^{2}). The racial makeup of the borough was 88.50% White, 8.41% African American, 0.14% Native American, 1.93% Asian, 0.03% Pacific Islander, 0.28% from other races, and 0.70% from two or more races. Hispanic or Latino of any race were 1.15% of the population.

There were 1,519 households, out of which 23.7% had children under the age of 18 living with them, 67.2% were married couples living together, 5.7% had a female householder with no husband present, and 25.2% were non-families. 21.9% of all households were made up of individuals, and 10.8% had someone living alone who was 65 years of age or older. The average household size was 2.34 and the average family size was 2.73.

In the borough the population was spread out, with 18.1% under the age of 18, 3.6% from 18 to 24, 22.9% from 25 to 44, 31.7% from 45 to 64, and 23.7% who were 65 years of age or older. The median age was 48 years. For every 100 females, there were 93.1 males. For every 100 females age 18 and over, there were 90.4 males.

The median income for a household in the borough was $67,321, and the median income for a family was $74,969. Males had a median income of $52,259 versus $35,464 for females. The per capita income for the borough was $37,964. About 1.8% of families and 3.1% of the population were below the poverty line, including 3.2% of those under age 18 and 2.4% of those age 65 or over.

== Government and politics ==
Presidential elections results
Year	Republican	Democratic	Third parties
2020	32% 771	67% 1,613	0.9% 23
2016	36% 761	62% 1,326	2% 51
2012	43% 931	56% 1,237	1% 22

== Transportation ==
Interstate 376, known (to east of downtown Pittsburgh) as the "Parkway East" by native Pittsburghers, runs through Churchill. Westbound I-376 from Churchill goes to Interstate 279 and downtown Pittsburgh, while eastbound I-376 goes to the Pennsylvania Turnpike. In addition, U.S. Route 22 (on the same road as I-376) travels through Churchill. Several bus lines of the Port Authority of Allegheny County travel through Churchill, offering service to downtown Pittsburgh west of Churchill, and also to Monroeville east of Pittsburgh, where Monroeville Mall and several Port Authority park-and-ride lots for bus commuters are located.

The Parkway East used to end at Churchill (in the traffic configuration just before it was extended to the Turnpike at Monroeville), with traffic having to continue ahead on U.S. 22—now business U.S. 22—to get from there to the Pennsylvania Turnpike. When the Parkway East ended there, there was a black-lettering-on-white-background sign "PARKWAY ENDS", because straight ahead there began to be grade-level intersections.

== Education ==
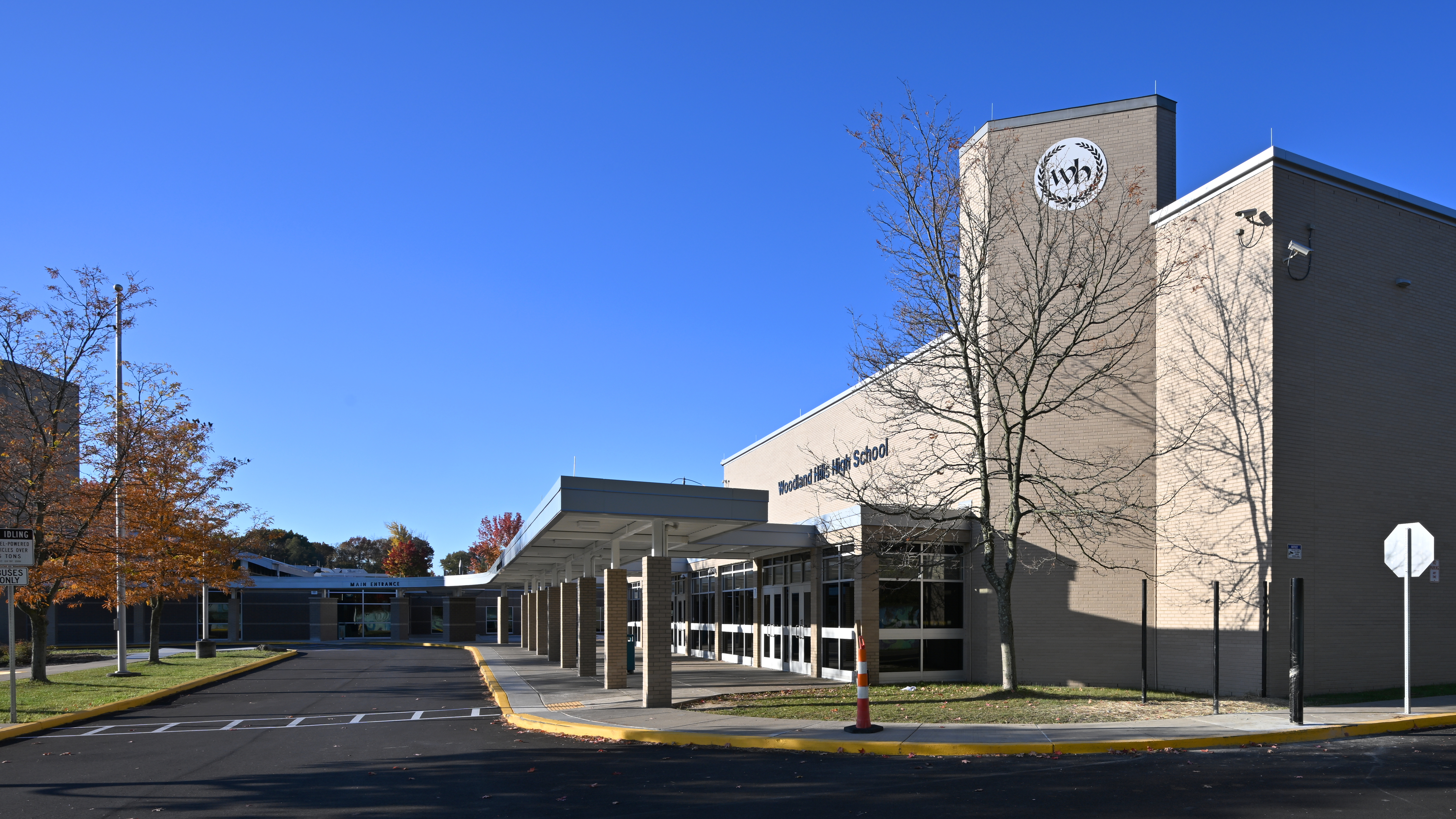
Woodland Hills High School

Churchill is served by the Woodland Hills School District.

Woodland Hills High School is in Churchill.

Shaffer Primary School, previously in the borough, was razed. The borough had a proposal to put senior housing where Shaffer used to be.

== See also ==
- Blackridge, Pennsylvania
