= Guy Primus =

American entrepreneur and inventor (born 1969)

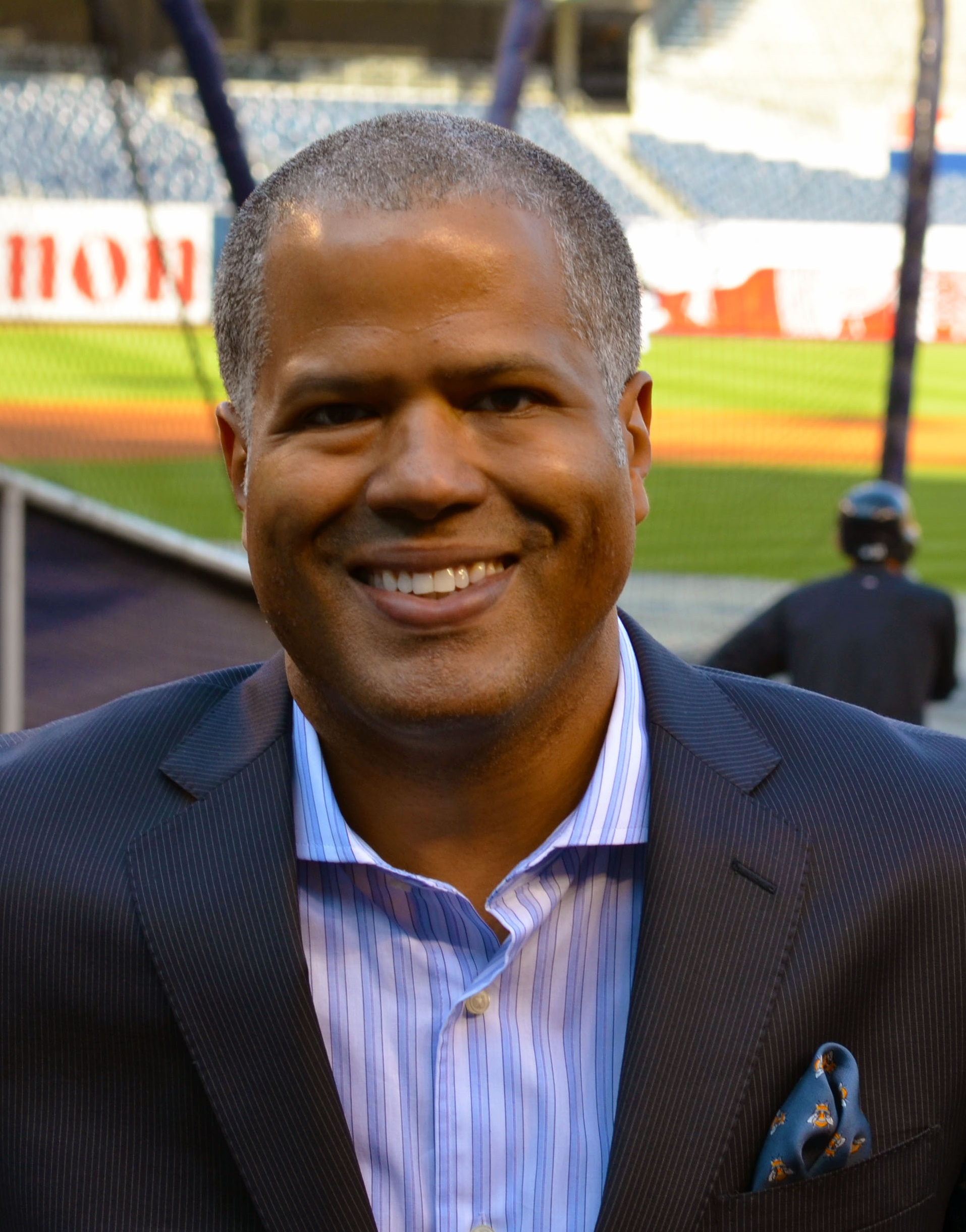
- Guy Primus (2014)
- Born: Pittsburgh, Pennsylvania
- Education: MBA, Harvard Business School; BS & MS in Industrial Engineering, Georgia Tech
- Title: CEO & co-founder, The Virtual Reality Company
- Board member of: Southern California Public Radio; Georgia Tech Advisory Board; Georgia Tech School of Industrial and Systems Engineering (past chairman)

Guy Primus (born July 1969), is an American entrepreneur and inventor. He is chief executive officer of Valence Enterprises, and is a member of the Board of Trustees of Southern California Public Radio. He is also the chairman emeritus of the School of Industrial and Systems Engineering advisory board at Georgia Tech.

In 2018, Primus earned a patent for his invention "Emotion-based experience feedback."

Primus was recognized by Black Enterprise as one of the most influential Black people in technology and is a 2017 Ebony Power 100 honoree. In 2013, he was named a Captain of Industry by the Institute of Industrial Engineers.

== Early life and education ==
Guy Primus was born in 1969 in Pittsburgh, Pennsylvania. Primus is a 1987 graduate of Penn Hills High School in Pittsburgh, Pennsylvania, where he earned a National Achievement scholarship. He earned his BS in Industrial Engineering from Georgia tech in 1992 and was president of the African American Student Union. He received his MS in Industrial Engineering from Georgia Tech in 1995 and his MBA from Harvard Business School in 2000. He is also a member of Kappa Alpha Psi fraternity.

== Career ==
After graduating from Georgia Tech with his master's degree, Primus started his career as at CAPS Logistics, a logistics software company started by his mentor and former professor, H. Donald Ratliff before becoming a consultant with A.T. Kearney in Alexandria, Virginia. Primus left Kearney in 1998 to pursue his MBA, and, upon graduating from Harvard Business School, he combined his passions of technology and media to start an online market research company called UrbanIQ, which later became the basis for Blue Flame Marketing + Advertising, the agency founded by entertainment mogul Sean Combs. After leaving Blue Flame, Primus joined Microsoft, where he became group product marketing manager for MSN Entertainment. There, he conceived "The Scenario" which was recognized as Best Branded Entertainment Experience at the 2005 ad:Tech awards.

Primus then joined Starbucks as head of digital media for Starbucks Entertainment where he led the creation of the popular Pick of the Week program for Starbucks and Apple. Primus was then recruited to Overbrook Entertainment to launch the company's digital media group. He eventually rose to the position of Chief Operating Officer, reporting directly to co-chief executive officers Will Smith and James Lassiter. While at Overbrook, Primus co-founded Tentpole Ventures, a seed-stage investment vehicle whose portfolio includes Pinterest and Dollar Shave Club.

Primus left Overbrook in 2013 to pursue entrepreneurial endeavors and co-founded The Core Venture Studio and The Collider co-working space before co-founding The Virtual Reality Company with Robert Stromberg, Chris Edwards and Joel Newton. He became their chief executive officer in the summer of 2015 and served as an executive producer of the Martian VR, which won a Cannes Lions award, Raising a Rukus, which won a Lumiere Award, and Jurassic WorldVR Expedition, which was named as Best Location-Based VR Experience by UploadVR.

== Personal life ==
Guy Primus is married to Heather Thompson Primus and the couple has two children, Grant and Clarke. He is a two time judge of the InVenture Prize venture competition, He is also a member of the Television Academy.

Primus assisted former Intel chief executive officerO Paul Otellini on the President's Jobs Council
