= Pennsylvania State Route System =

Highway system of Pennsylvania in the United States

- Route markers for Interstate 76, U.S. Route 6, Pennsylvania Route 18, and State Route 3069

System information
- Length: 42,825 mi (68,920 km)
- Notes: Numbers are assigned through Location Referencing System; all routes are assigned quadrant numbers, State Route X (SR X), which usually corresponded to the signed numbers of traffic routes (PA X). Traffic Routes are generally state-maintained.

Highway names
- Interstates: Interstate X (I-X)
- US Highways: U.S. Route X (US X)
- State: Pennsylvania Route X (PA X)
- Quadrant Routes: State Route X (SR X)

System links
- Pennsylvania State Route System; Interstate; US; State; Scenic; Legislative

In the U.S. state of Pennsylvania, state highways are generally maintained by the Pennsylvania Department of Transportation (PennDOT). Each is assigned a four-digit State Route (SR) number in the present Location Referencing System. Traffic Routes are signed as Interstate Highways, U.S. Routes and Pennsylvania Routes (PA Routes), and are prefixed with one to three zeroes to give a four-digit number. PA Routes are also called Pennsylvania Traffic Routes, and formerly State Highway Routes.

There are 42,825 mi (68,920 km) of roadway maintained by state agencies, with 39,715 mi (63,915 km) maintained by PennDOT, 566 mi (911 km) maintained by the Pennsylvania Turnpike Commission, and 2,544 mi (4,094 km) maintained by other state agencies.

== History ==
The Pennsylvania State Route System was established by the Sproul Road Bill passed in 1911. The system took control of over 4,000 miles of road. The system of roads continued to grow over the next few decades until continual addition of roads faced greater opposition. On October 1, 1940, the Pennsylvania Turnpike's first section of highway was opened to motorized traffic; the Turnpike operated under the Pennsylvania Turnpike Commission and was independent of the then-known Department of Highways.

In 1970, the Department of Highways and several other offices and departments were reorganized into the Pennsylvania Department of Transportation. In 1987, the Sproul system of Legislative Routes was reorganized into the current Pennsylvania State Route System under the Location Referencing System.

In 2013, PennDOT posted weight restrictions on several bridges along the state route system. As a result, several truck routes were signed for U.S. and state routes, bypassing these weight restricted bridges. Signage practices for these truck routes vary by district, with some districts such as District 5 signing them as standard truck routes and others such as District 6 signing them as double-bannered "alternate truck" routes.

== Location Referencing System ==
LRS number assignments
| Route number | Name | Description |
|---|---|---|
| 0001–0999 | Traffic routes | Leading zeroes are often omitted on the markers |
| 1001–4999 | Quadrant routes | assigned by rough quadrant in the county, going clockwise from the northeast (1) to northwest (4) |
| 6001–6999 | Relocated traffic routes | (Including alternate lanes such as local lanes or HOV lanes), assigned a number equal to the old number plus 6000 |
| 7001–7999 | Turned back, abandoned, or null routes | 7076, 7276, 7376, 7576, 7476, 7043, and 7066 are used for sections of the Pennsylvania Turnpike |
| 8001–8999 | Interchanges | With one number per interchange |
| 9101–9199 | Wye connections | |
| 9201–9299 | Rest areas | |
| 9301–9399 | Truck escape ramps | |
| 9401–9499 | Other roadways | Includes jughandles and truck inspection stations |
| 9501–9599 | Park and ride | |

=== Signage ===
The symbol used for the signage of state routes is an outline of the keystone after Pennsylvania's nickname. Four-digit State Routes are unsigned, except on small white reference markers near physical features such as intersections and bridges, and are unique within each county. Underneath, there is a larger typeface number identifying the segment of highway being entered. Segments are typically one half mile long and are usually numbered in multiples of 10 on non-Interstate highways. Segment numbers increase in the north or east direction, and are even-numbered on undivided highways and on the northbound or eastbound direction of divided highways.

=== Circumstances with some routes ===
Special routes are not assigned State Route numbers corresponding to their signed numbers but are instead marked along other routes, mostly Quadrant Routes.

Concurrencies are assigned a number equal to the smaller number of the concurrent routes, or the highest type (Quadrant Route → PA Route → U.S. Route → Interstate).

Occasionally, a signed Traffic Route number does not match the State Route, usually in the case of an extension or relocation. (One example is Pennsylvania Route 3, which uses a one-way pair of Quadrant Routes in Center City Philadelphia.) A different number can also be used to avoid conflicts between different types — for instance, signed Pennsylvania Route 380 is actually State Route 400, renumbered ca. 1973 when Interstate 81E was renumbered Interstate 380. The majority of, but not all, signed Traffic Routes are state-maintained.

== Lists of routes ==
| Interstate Highways: A list of interstate highways. |
| U.S. Routes: A list of U.S. highways. |
| State Routes: A list of state routes. |

== See also ==
- Pennsylvania Turnpike
- Transportation in Pennsylvania
- List of BicyclePA bicycle routes
