= Brackenridge =

Brackenridge can refer to:

== Places ==
- Brackenridge, Pennsylvania
- Brackenridge Park, in San Antonio, Texas
- Brackenridge Park Golf Course, in San Antonio, Texas

== Other uses ==
- Brackenridge (surname)
- A University of Pittsburgh residence hall, Brackenridge Hall
- University Medical Center Brackenridge, a hospital in Austin, Texas
- Brackenridge Works, an Allegheny Technologies steel mill in Brackenridge, Pennsylvania
- Brackenridge High School, a public high school in central San Antonio, Texas

== See also ==
- Bracken Ridge, Queensland, Australia
- Breckenridge (disambiguation)
- Breckinridge (disambiguation)
