= Breckenridge =

Breckenridge may refer to:

== People ==
- Breckenridge (surname)
- Breckenridge Ellis

== Places ==
=== United States ===
- Breckenridge, Colorado
  - Breckenridge Ski Resort, an alpine ski resort in the western United States, in Colorado at the town of Breckenridge
  - Breckenridge 100, annual bike race
- Breckenridge, Hancock County, Illinois
- Breckenridge, Sangamon County, Illinois
- Breckenridge, Michigan
- Breckenridge, Minnesota
- Breckenridge, Missouri
- Breckenridge, Oklahoma
- Breckenridge, Texas
- Breckenridge Hills, Missouri
- Breckenridge Reservoir, on Chopawamsic Creek, Virginia
- Breckenridge Township, Caldwell County, Missouri
- Breckenridge Township, Wilkin County, Minnesota

=== Canada ===
- Breckenridge Greens, Edmonton, Alberta

== See also ==
- Brackenridge (disambiguation)
- Breckinridge (disambiguation)
