= 2021 Allegheny Technologies strike =

Labor strike in the United States

- Date: March 30 – July 13, 2021 (3 months, 1 week and 6 days)
- Location: Northern United States (Note: The specific cities are: Waterbury, Connecticut; New Bedford, Massachusetts; Lockport, New York; Louisville, Ohio; Brackenridge, Pennsylvania; Latrobe, Pennsylvania; Natrona Heights, Pennsylvania; Vandergrift, Pennsylvania; Washington, Pennsylvania)
- Caused by: Disagreements between union and company over terms of new labor contract
- Goals: Maintaining premium-free health care plan; Stopping changes to scheduling and overtime; Protections against outsourcing; Increase wages
- Methods: Picketing; Strike action; Walkout
- Result: Union agrees to new labor contract that addresses their original concerns

Parties
Allegheny Technologies	United Steelworkers

The 2021 Allegheny Technologies strike was a labor strike involving about 1,300 workers for metals manufacturing company Allegheny Technologies Incorporated (ATI), all unionized with the United Steelworkers (USW). The strike began on March 30 and ended on July 13 with the ratification of a new labor contract. Strikers returned to work by July 19. According to the Northwest Labor Press, the strike was among the country's largest for 2021 by number of strikers involved.

In 2020, ATI was severely affected by the COVID-19 pandemic, with the company reporting over $1 billion in losses for that year. In February of that year, the company's labor contract with the USW (which represented roughly 1,300 employees in nine facilities) expired, but citing the pandemic and a general lack of progress in negotiations for a new contract, the union agreed to extend the expired contract until February 2021. By January of that year, negotiations had resumed, but like before, neither side could come to an agreement, with the main issue concerning the company's health care plan. The company was pushing for workers to pay a monthly premium, while the union was steadfast in objecting to premiums, arguing that adding premiums would negate the pay increase offered in the new contract. Additional issues included concerns over outsourcing and opposition to changes to the company's scheduling and overtime system. On March 5, several days after the extended contract had expired, workers voted to authorize strike action, and on the morning of March 30, they performed a walkout and began picketing.

Over the next few months, the company and union held on-again off-again negotiations, during which time the main point of contention continued to be the health care plan. In late May, federal mediators became involved, by which point the two sides had settled almost all other issues. On July 6, following several days of intense negotiations, the union announced a tentative agreement with the company that included a guarantee of no premiums in the workers' health care plan. Workers voted to accept the agreement on July 13 and returned to work by July 19. The new contract has generally been seen as a win for the union, as it addresses all of the issues they had had with the company's original proposals. At the same time, the union estimates that the strike cost the company millions of dollars, with the company posting a $49.2 million loss for the second quarter of 2021.

== Background ==
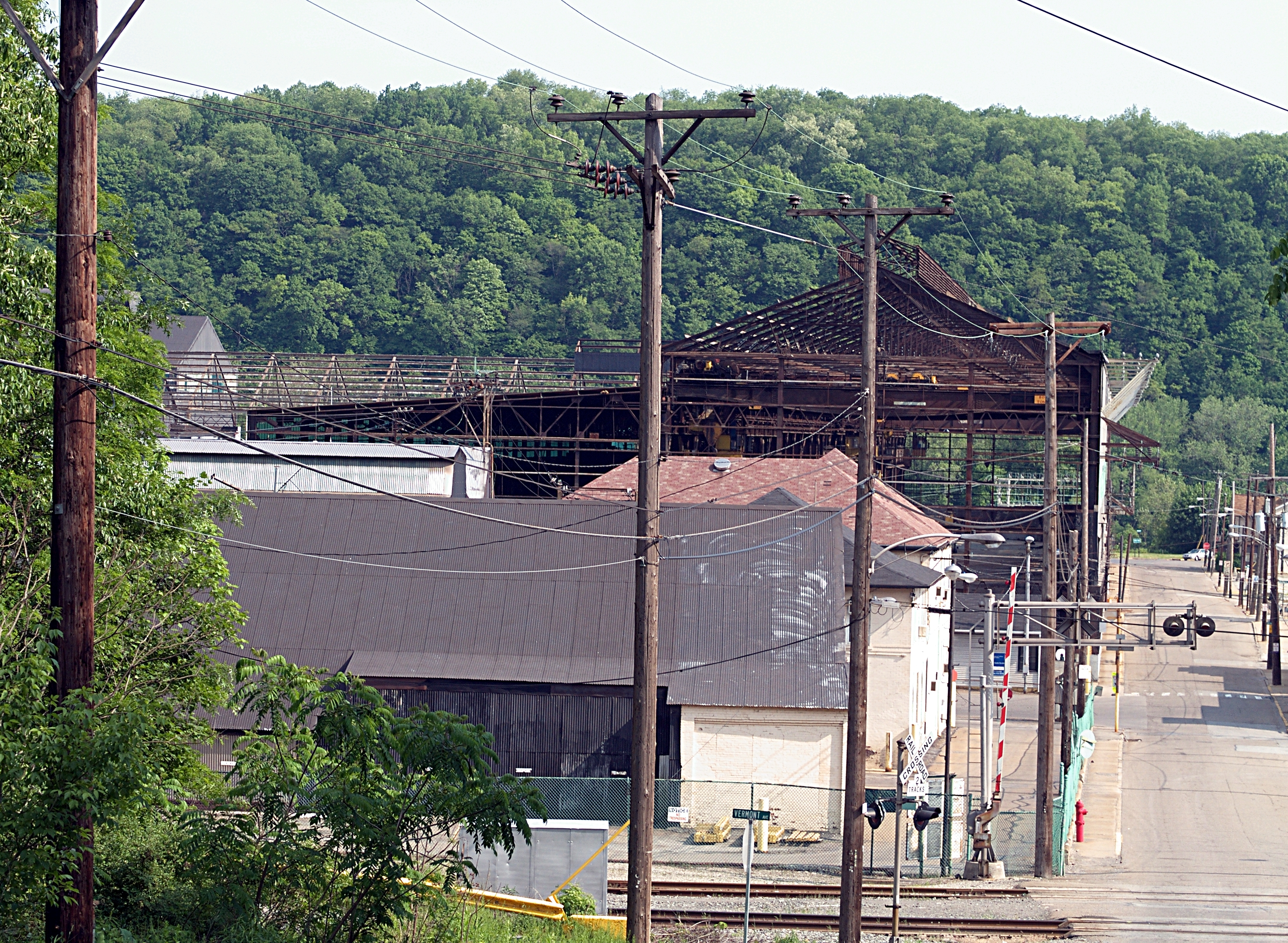
Partial view of ATI's facility in Brackenridge, Pennsylvania, 2009

Allegheny Technologies Incorporated (ATI) is an American metals manufacturing company with facilities located throughout the Northern United States. Amidst the COVID-19 pandemic in 2020, the company suffered a loss of income of US$1.6 billion and announced plans to cut approximately 400 jobs, with the Pittsburgh Post-Gazette describing the company as a "struggling Pittsburgh-based metals giant". Going into 2020, several hundred unionized workers, organized under the United Steelworkers (USW), were working under a four-year labor contract that had been approved in 2016 following a six-month lockout, the first in ATI's history. This contract expired on February 29, 2020, With negotiations for a new contract starting the previous month. However, by March 2020, in light of the pandemic and a lack of progress on negotiations for a new contract, the union agreed to a one-year contract extension that would expire on February 28, 2021. In addition, ATI gave each worker a $500 bonus as a show of good faith in continuing the negotiations with the union. The contract covered approximately 1,300 (Note: One source gives this number as 1,400.) workers in nine facilities, located in Waterbury, Connecticut; New Bedford, Massachusetts; Lockport, New York; Louisville, Ohio; and the Pennsylvania locales of Brackenridge, Latrobe, Natrona Heights, Vandergrift, and Washington. (Note: One source additionally mentions plants in Monaca, Oakdale, and Zelienople, all in Pennsylvania.)

In January 2021, the union and company recommenced negotiations, but similar to the previous year, they struggled to come to an agreement. The company's proposal of an immediate $3,000 payment to workers with an additional 8.5 percent pay raise spread out over the course of the four-year contract was considered too little, especially given that the workers had previously had a seven-year wage freeze. Furthermore, the union alleged that changes to the company's overtime system could cause some workers to work 12-hour shifts while not receiving overtime pay due to not having worked over 40 hours per week. Additional concerns included changes that the union stated would cause some outsourcing of union work to contractors. Workers also complained about the lack of cost-of-living allowances from the company. ATI countered that the proposal would see wage increases while maintaining the workers' premium-free health insurance plan, which was guaranteed for the first three years of the plan and became an option starting in 2024. One union member stated that the monthly cost of the premium would have negated the increase in pay. As a result of the impasse, the contract expired without a replacement on February 28 and several days later, on March 5, union members voted to authorize strike action, with about 95 percent in favor. This authorization meant that union leadership could commence a strike without holding an additional round of voting. In the days following the vote, hundreds of union members held multiple rallies at the nine facilities that would be affected. On March 9, the union filed a charge with the National Labor Relations Board that the company had been withholding "essential bargaining information".

On March 26, USW announced that the ATI workers would be going on strike over unfair labor practices starting at 7 a.m. on March 30. This would be the first strike ATI had experienced since a 69-day strike in 1994. Following the announcement, ATI stated they would be using remaining salaried employees and interns to continue operations, with one industry analyst speculating that the company would focus on their most profitable products, like titanium. The analyst also speculated that the strike action would hurt ATI and help industry competitors Acerinox and Outokumpu, who operated non-union plants in the right-to-work states of Alabama and Kentucky. In a last-minute effort to avoid the strike, on March 29, the company rescinded portions of the contract that would have changed the contracting system and made changes to its health care proposal, but this offer was also rejected. Additionally, news articles published the day the strike began stated that the company was offering 9 percent wage increase, (Note: The increase would be spread out over the first three years of the contract in 3 percent annual increases.) in addition to a $4,000 lump sum payment.

== Course of the strike ==
As announced, at 7 a.m. on March 30, approximately 1,300 ATI employees at the nine locations performed a walkout. Immediately following this, they commenced picketing against the company. Within the first day of the strike, union representatives claimed that they had made progress in negotiations and were willing to accept a $4,000 payment alongside 11 percent wage increases over the course of the contract, but were still at odds with the company over the terms of the health care policy. On April 14, USW announced that strikers would qualify for COBRA health care through the American Rescue Plan Act once their ATI plans expire at the end of April. On April 19, union and company representatives met for renewed negotiations. By this time, the company stated that they had withdrawn their proposals regarding outsourcing and scheduling, with health care remaining the main point of contention. However, by April 22, the union had rejected the proposal set forth by the company. Following this, the company gave the union an ultimatum, saying that if the union did not accept the company's proposal by April 26, proposals made by the company would "begin to reflect the costs incurred by ATI as a result of the strike". The union still rejected the company's proposal, again citing issues with the company's proposed health care plan. On April 29, about a month into the strike, ATI announced that they had sustained a $7.9 million loss for the first financial quarter of 2021.

On May 6, USW submitted a counterproposal to the company, which was rejected by the company later that same day, with the company calling the offer a "bait and switch". By May 14, representatives from both the union and company stated they would be open to mediation through the Federal Mediation and Conciliation Service. This happened on May 21, with both sides negotiating with a federal mediator present. Additionally around this time, company representatives claimed that all production orders were being met during the strike, a statement refuted by union representatives, who claimed that customers were placing orders with ATI's competitors. Despite the federal mediation, negotiations continued into June. However, by this time, USW claimed that ATI was no longer actively pushing for the health care premiums and were instead discussing other cost-cutting methods with the health care plan. By June 19 though, negotiations had once again stalled. On June 21, USW's local union in New Bedford held a rally that was widely attended by members of other labor unions in the area and featured Massachusetts State Representative Antonio Cabral speaking out in support of the strikers. USW local unions in other affected areas also held rallies to keep up support for the strike.

On July 6, after three months on strike, multiple news sources reported that a tentative agreement had been reached between the union and company following several days of negotiations the previous week. According to a union representative, as part of the agreement, (which had been reached on July 2) union members would not have to pay a monthly insurance premium. At the time of the announcement, voting on accepting the terms of the agreement was scheduled to begin on July 13. That day, union members voted to ratify the deal, with workers returning to their positions July 19. The union did not reveal voting details. With the agreement, the company stated that they intended to be back to full production by September.

== Aftermath ==
The four-year labor contract between ATI and USW was retroactive, starting from March 1, 2021 and running to February 28, 2025. As per the terms of the contract, the workers would receive a three percent annual wage increase starting every March 1. In addition, they would receive a one-time bonus of $4,000 and additional payments of $1,500 on February 1 of 2025 and 2025. Pertaining to the health care, the workers would not have to pay any monthly premium, but in exchange there would be increases to copays and deductibles. Additionally, increases in drug costs would be capped at 3.5 percent annually. A committee was also formed by the union and company with the goal of seeking out ways to keep health care costs low. The contract also contained provisions that the union says protects against outsourcing and addresses other minor issues. The settlement was considered a success for the union, with one representative stating that almost all of the union's demands had been met. The union claimed that ATI lost $100 million, stating that the price of steel had risen to an all-time high during the strike and that the company had been unable to fully capitalize on that. For the second quarter of 2021, ATI reported a loss of $49.2 million.

On July 19, the Pittsburgh Tribune-Review reported on complaints from some union members who contended that the company was withholding the $4,000 bonuses, with the union alleging that the company's actions were "blatantly contrary to our agreement".

== See also ==
- Strikes during the COVID-19 pandemic
