= Alfred T. Palmer =

American photographer

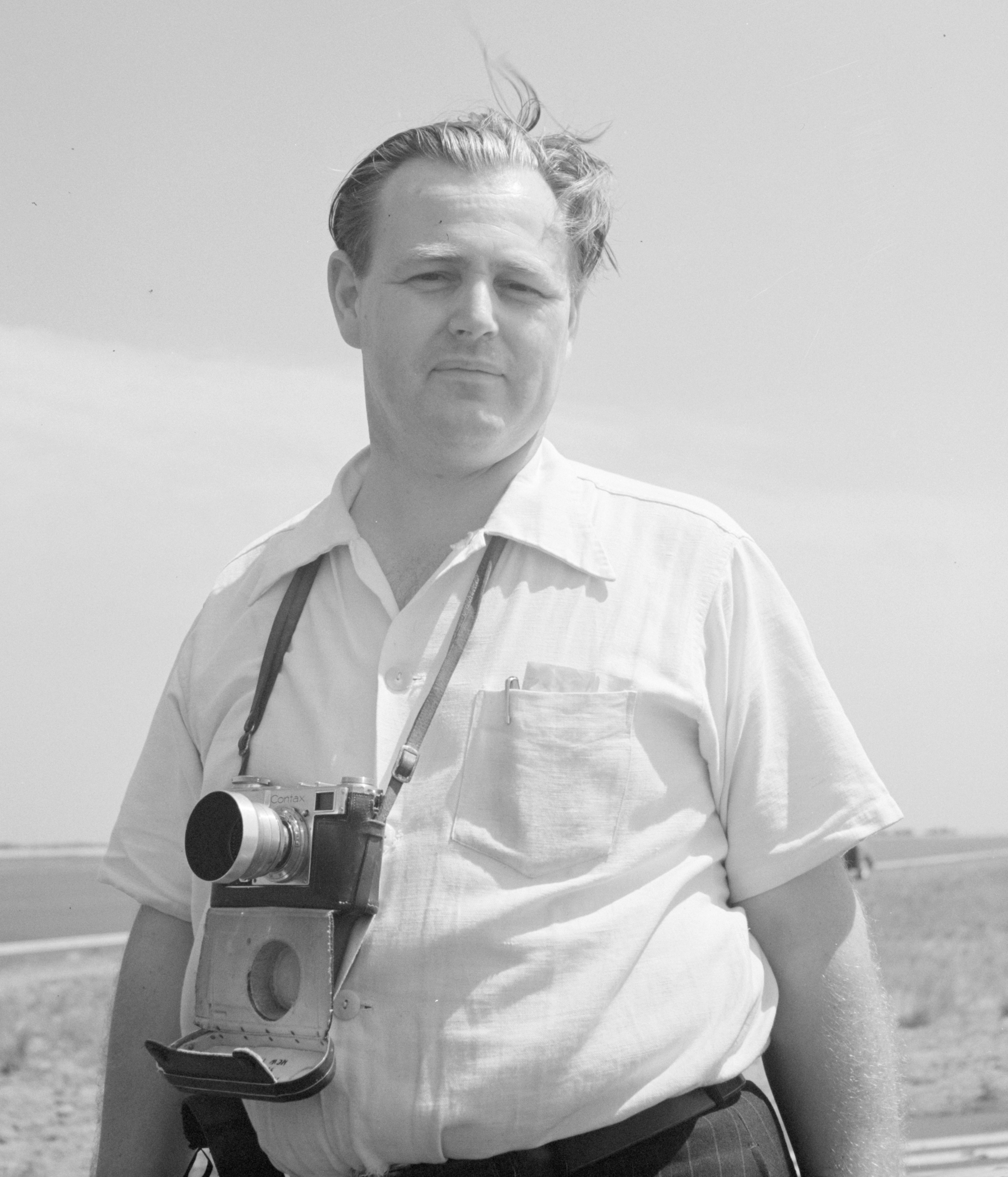
- Alfred T. Palmer in May 1942
- Born: March 17, 1906; San Jose, California, U.S.
- Died: January 31, 1993 (aged 86)
- Known for: Photography

Alfred T. Palmer (March 17, 1906 – January 31, 1993) was an American photographer best known for his photographs depicting Americana during World War II, taken for the Office of War Information from 1942 to 1943.

== Gallery ==
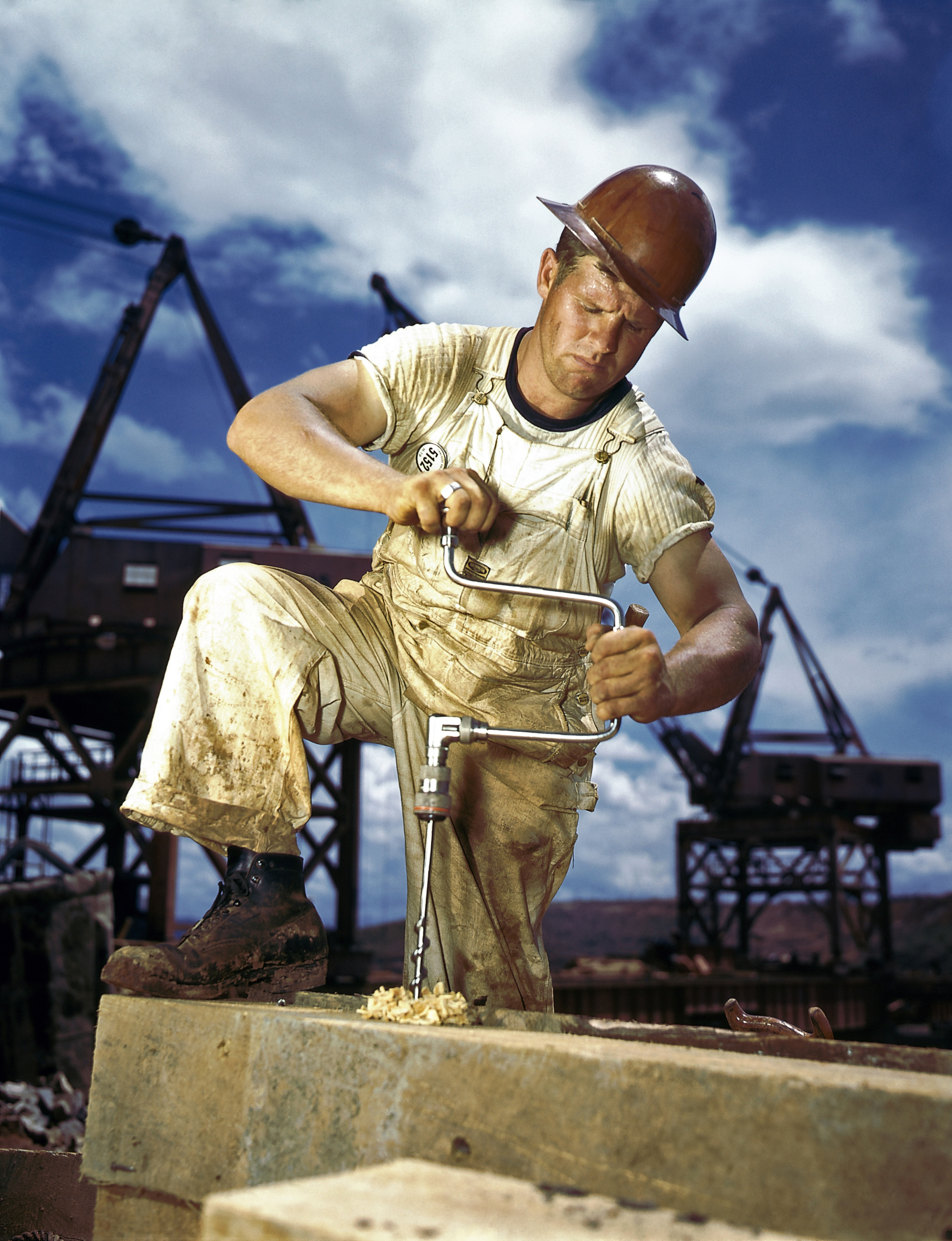
Carpenter at work on Douglas Dam, Tennessee (built by the Tennessee Valley Authority), 1942

Allegheny Ludlum Steele Corp Brackenridge Works in Brackenridge, Pennsylvania, 1941

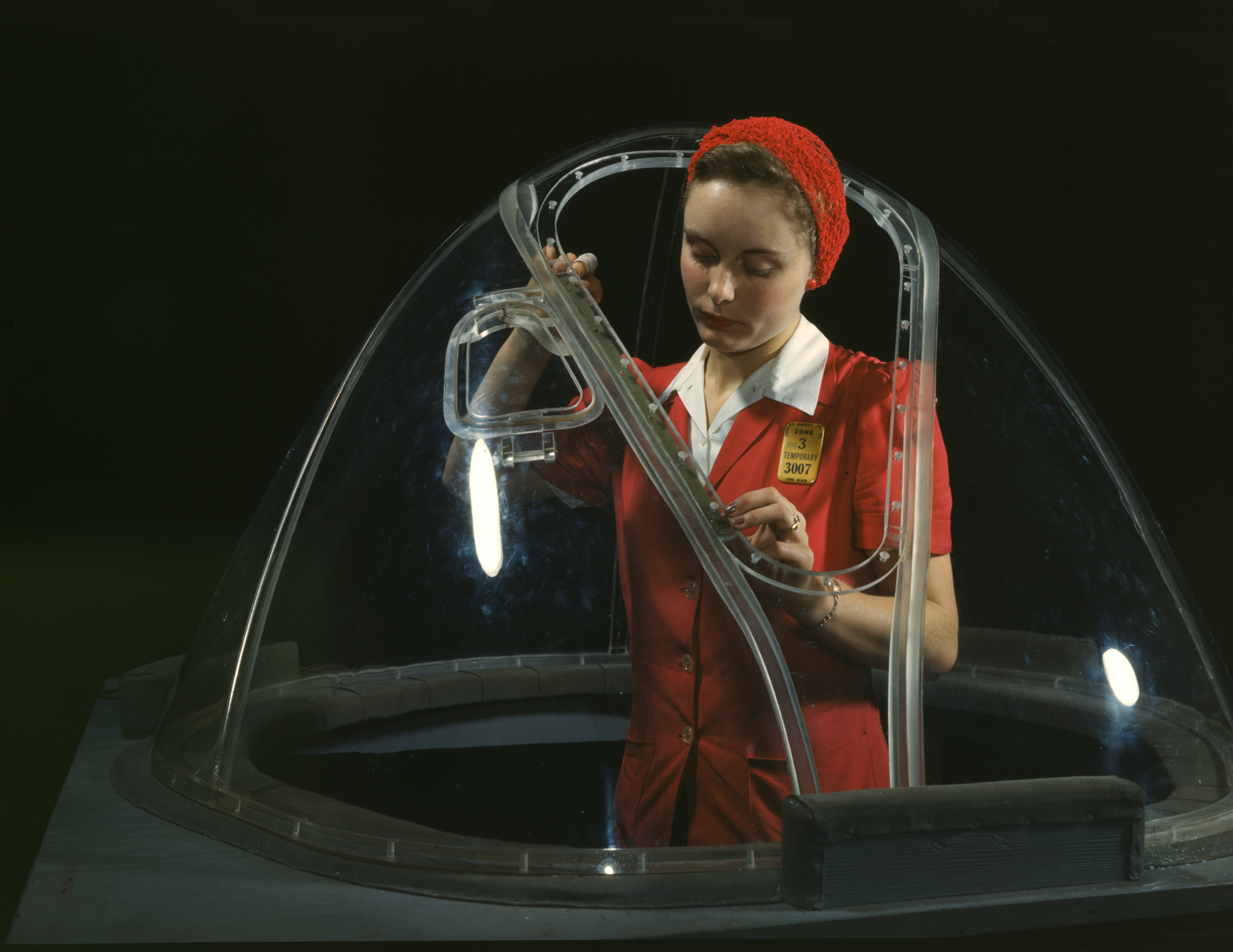
Worker in the Douglas Aircraft Company plant in Long Beach, California, 1942

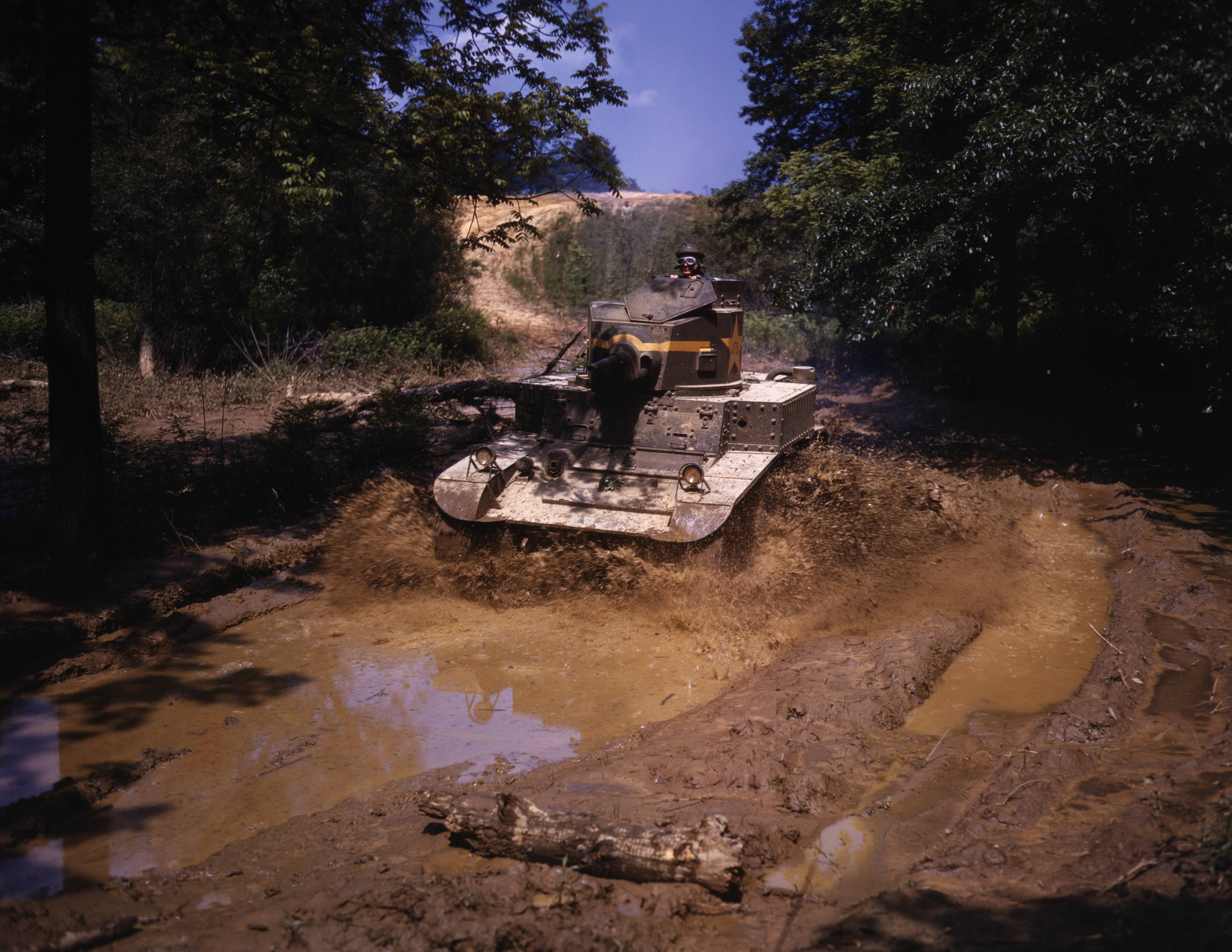
An M2 light tank at Fort Knox photographed by Palmer in June 1942.

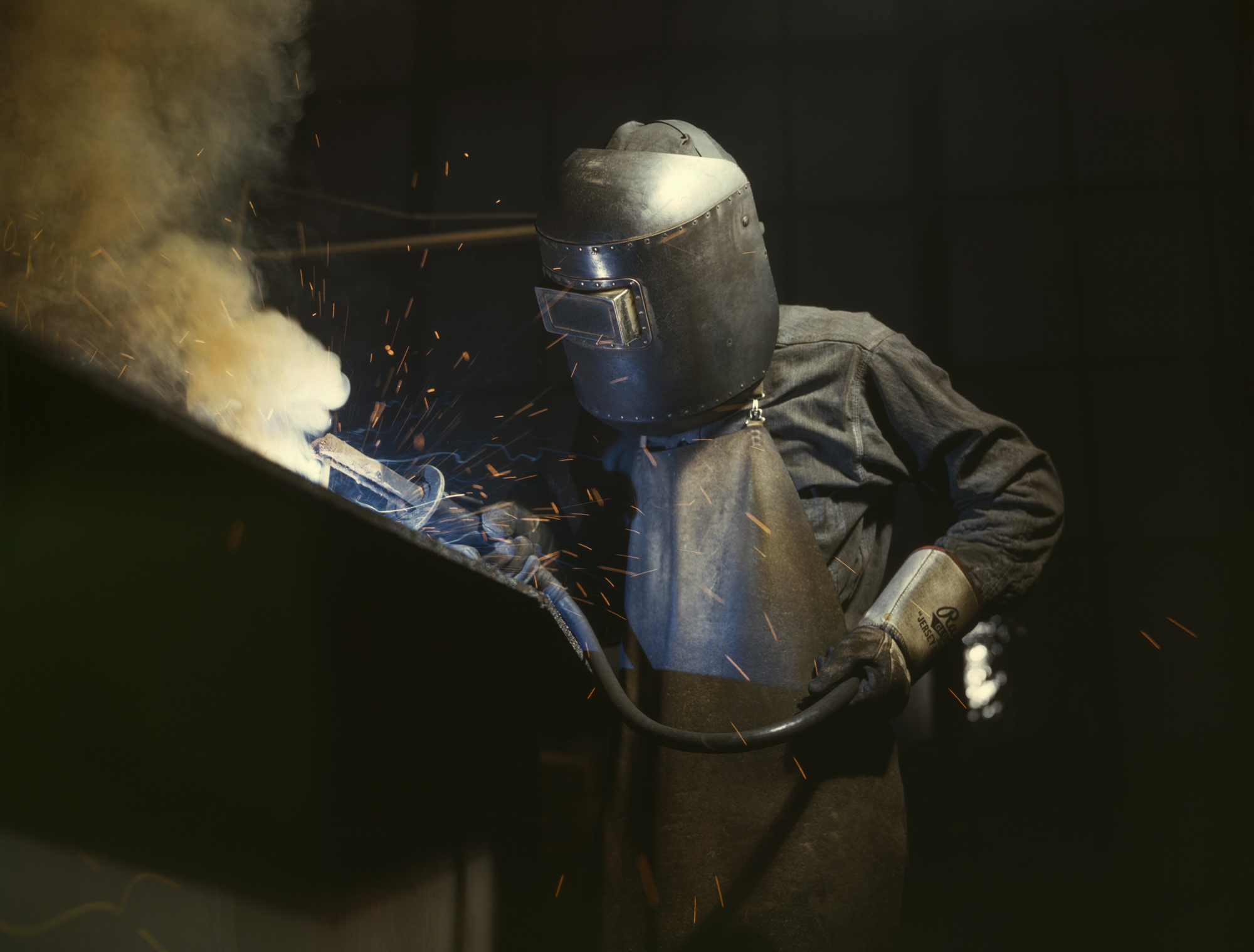
A welder making the boilers for ship, 1942.
