= Breckenridge, Illinois =

Breckenridge, Illinois may refer to the following places in Illinois:

- Breckenridge, Hancock County, Illinois
- Breckenridge, Sangamon County, Illinois
