= Breckenridge (surname) =

Origin
- Language: Old Norse
- Meaning: "from Brackenrig"
- Region of origin: Scotland

Other names
- Variant form: Breckinridge

Breckenridge is a locational Scottish surname, referring to a person from a place named Breckenridge, and other phonetic spellings, e.g. Breckonridge, Breakenridge, Brackenridge, et al. Such names as the aforementioned are anglicizations of the Scottish place name "Brackenrig". There are several villages in Scotland named "Brackenrig", including in Lanarkshire, Ayrshire, Glasgow, and others. "Brackenrig" referred to plowed fields with ridges and ferns, prolific in this area. The prefix derives from braken (northern Middle English, meaning "bracken", itself derived from the Old Norse brækni). The suffix derives from rigg (meaning "ridge", from the Old Norse hryggr). Early spellings had several variations including Brecenrigg, Brecenrig, Breckinrigg, Breconrig, Breconnrigg; and these evolved to Brackenridge, Breakenridge, Breakinridge, Breckenridge, Breccinridge, Breckenridge, and others. As people moved, the surname spread to England and Ireland, becoming a common English and Irish surname as well. At the time of the British Census of 1881, the frequency of the surname Breckenridge was highest in Ayrshire (66.2 times the British average), followed by Haddingtonshire, Lanarkshire, Renfrewshire, Stirlingshire, Pembrokeshire, Argyll, Kirkcudbrightshire, Edinburghshire and Dunbartonshire. People with the surname include:

- Alexandra Breckenridge (born 1982), American actress
- Keith Breckenridge (born 1965), South African historian
- Beverly Breckenridge, Canadian musician
- Donald Breckenridge (1932–2005), American hotel chain founder and president
- Eddie Breckenridge (born 1979), American bassist with Thrice; brother of Riley
- Hugh Henry Breckenridge (1870–1937), American painter
- Jody A. Breckenridge, American coast guard rear admiral
- Laura Breckenridge (born 1983), American actress
- Patricia Breckenridge (born 1953), American jurist from Missouri
- Riley Breckenridge (born 1975), American drummer with Thrice; brother of Eddie
- Thomas Breckenridge (1865–1898), Scottish footballer

== See also ==
- Breakenridge (disambiguation)
- Breckinridge (disambiguation)
