= Brackenridge (surname) =

Brackenridge is a Scottish surname with origins in southern Lanarkshire, Scotland. Notable people with the surname include:

- George Washington Brackenridge (1832–1920), Texas philanthropist
- Henry Marie Brackenridge (1786–1871), writer, congressman
- Hugh Henry Brackenridge (1748–1816), writer, judge
- John Brackenridge (clergyman) (1772–1844), American clergyman
- John Brackenridge (baseball) (1880–1953), American baseball player
- Marian Brackenridge (1903–1999), American sculptor
- Mary Eleanor Brackenridge (1837–1924), Texas business woman, suffragist and civic organizer
- Steve Brackenridge (born 1984), English footballer
- Sureena Brackenridge, British politician
- Tyron Brackenridge (born 1984), Canadian football player
- William Brackenridge (1810–1893), Scottish botanist
- Celia Brackenridge OBE (1950–2018) British Sportswoman, campaigner and academic, co-founder of the Women's Sports Foundation (now Women in Sport) in 1984

== See also ==
- Breckenridge (surname)
