= Berry, Illinois =

- Unincorporated community
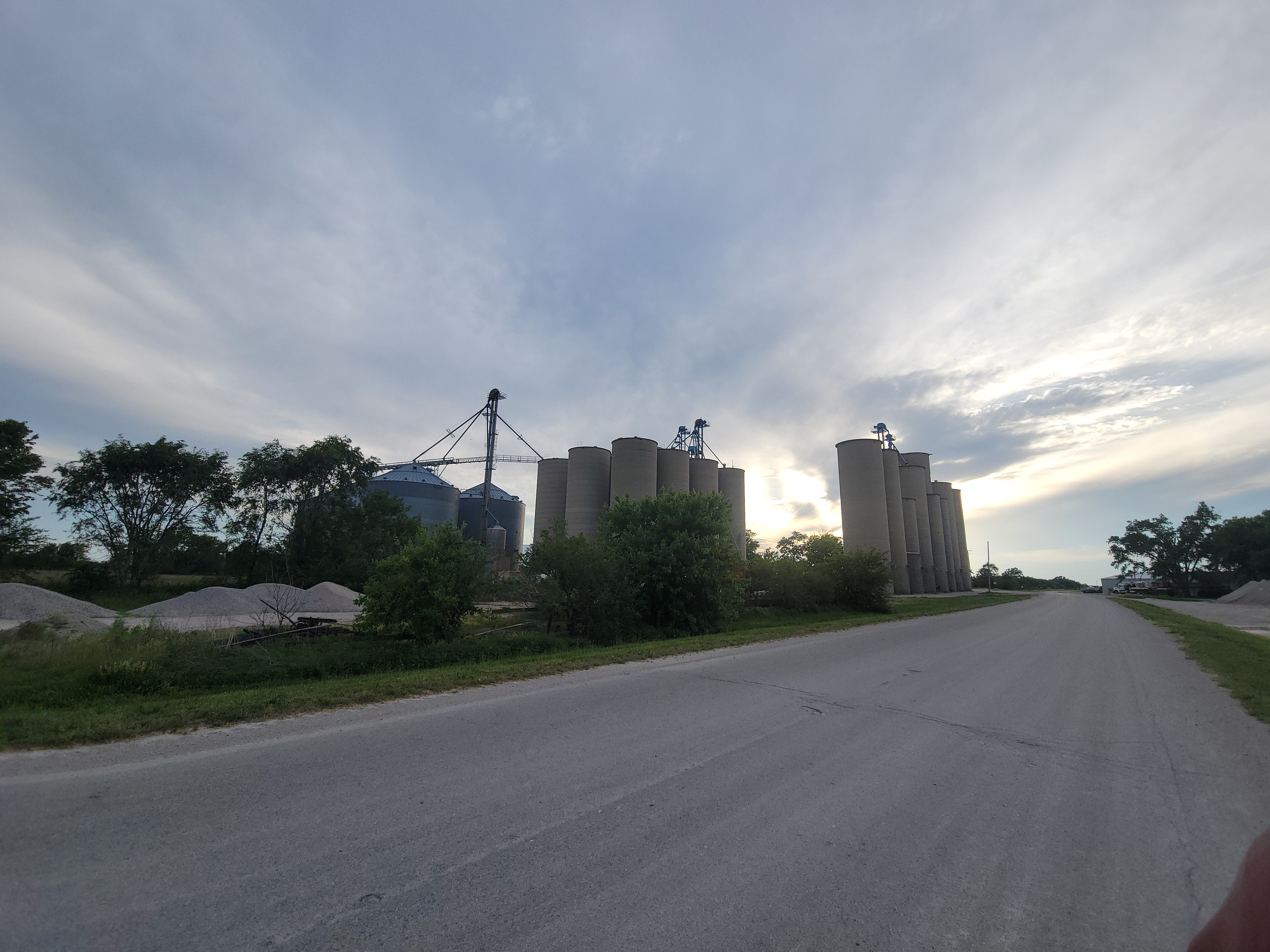
- Ramsey Grain elevators at Berry

- Location within Illinois Location within the United States
- Coordinates: 39°42′47″N 89°28′15″W
- Country: United States
- State: Illinois
- County: Sangamon
- Elevation: 591 ft (180 m)
- Time zone: UTC-6 (Central (CST))
  - Summer (DST): UTC-5 (CDT)
- Area code: 217
- GNIS feature ID: 1821036

Berry is an unincorporated community in Cooper Township, Sangamon County, Illinois, United States. Berry is near Illinois Route 29 about 11.5 miles (18.5 km) south-southeast of the Illinois State Capitol. In the Geographic Names Information System, Berry also has variant names of Clarksville, Custer, Mortaraville, and South Fork.
