= Breakenridge =

Breakenridge may refer to:

== People ==
- Billy Breakenridge (1846–1931) American lawman, teamster, railroader, soldier and author in the American Old West
- David Breakenridge Read (1823–1904), Canadian lawyer and politician
- Jared Breakenridge, American drag performer
- Raymond Breakenridge (1897–1982), American rancher and politician

== Places ==
- Mount Breakenridge, 2,395 m (7,858 ft), is a mountain in the Lillooet Ranges of southwestern British Columbia.
