= Steel mill =

Plant for steelmaking

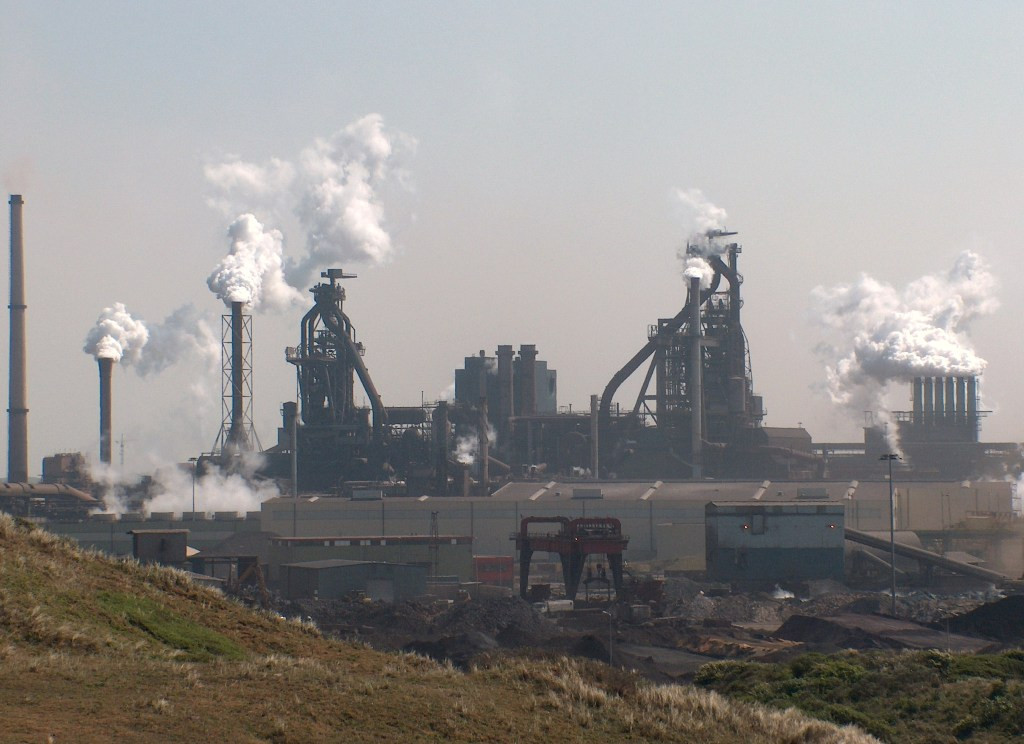
Integrated steel mill in the Netherlands. The two large towers are blast furnaces.

A steel mill or steelworks is an industrial plant for the manufacture of steel. It may be an integrated steel works carrying out all steps of steelmaking from smelting iron ore to rolled product, but may also be a plant where steel semi-finished casting products are made from molten pig iron or from scrap.

== History ==
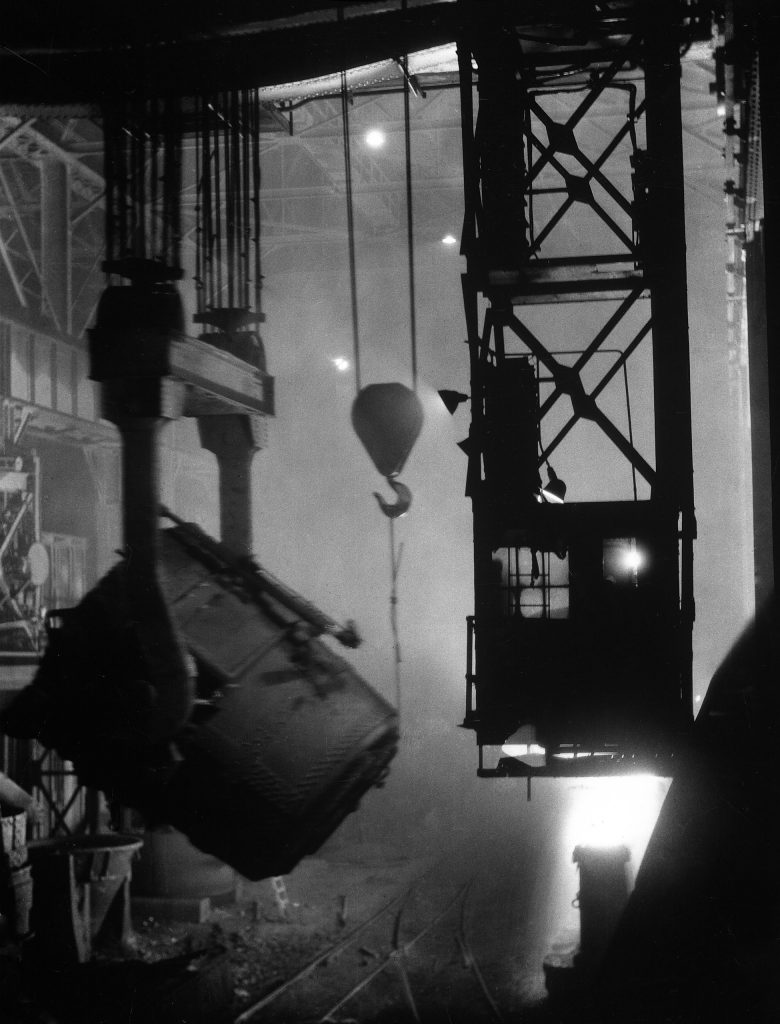
Otis Steel Mill, Ohio, 1929

Since the invention of the Bessemer process, steel mills have replaced ironworks, based on puddling or fining methods. New ways to produce steel appeared later: from scrap melted in an electric arc furnace and, more recently, from direct reduced iron processes.

Brackenridge Works, Pennsylvania, 1941

In the late 19th and early 20th centuries the world's largest steel mill was the Barrow Hematite Steel Company steelworks located in Barrow-in-Furness, United Kingdom. Today, the world's largest steel mill is in Gwangyang, South Korea.

== Integrated mill ==
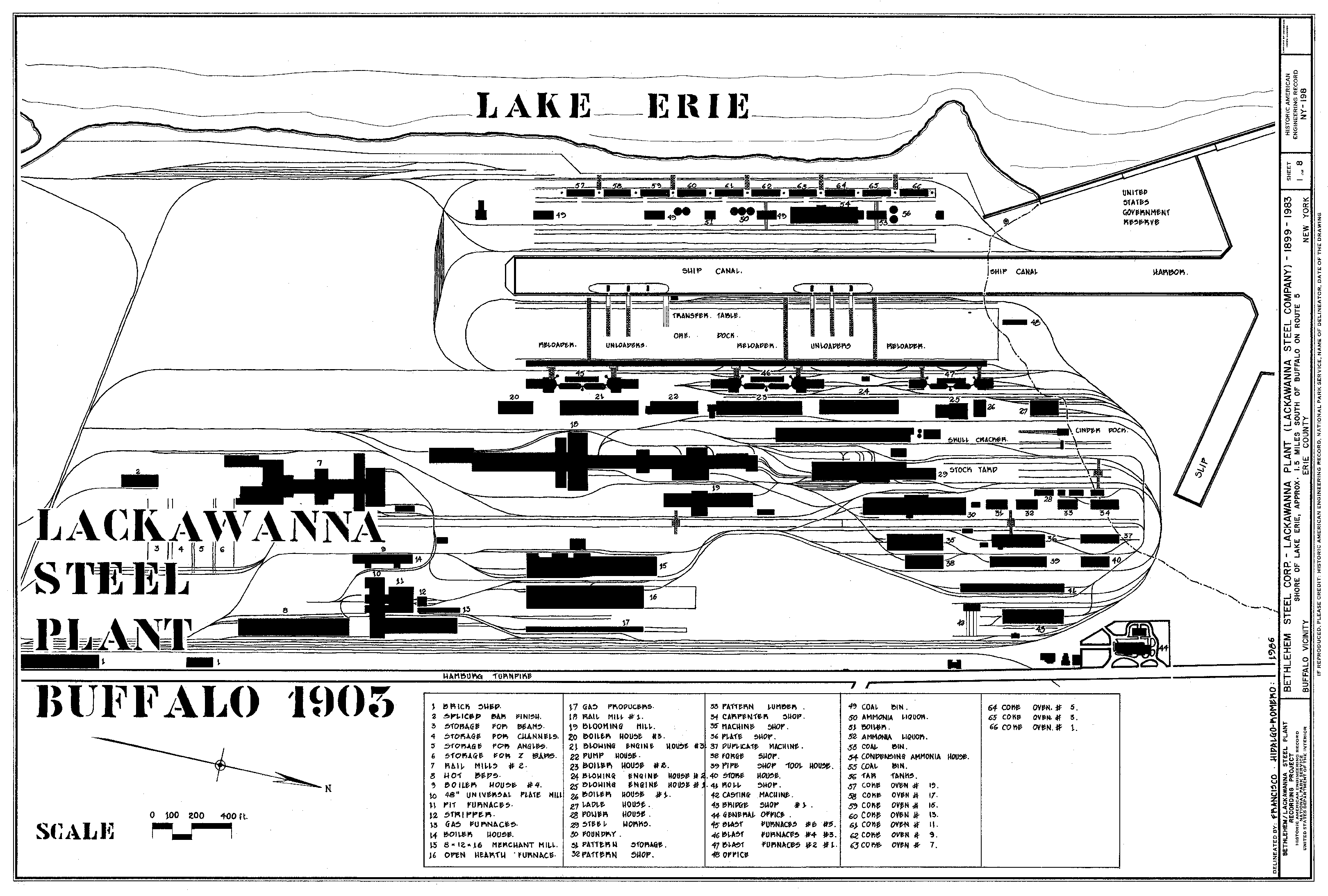
Plan of the Lackawanna Steel plant in Buffalo, New York ca. 1903, showing the various elements of an integrated steel mill

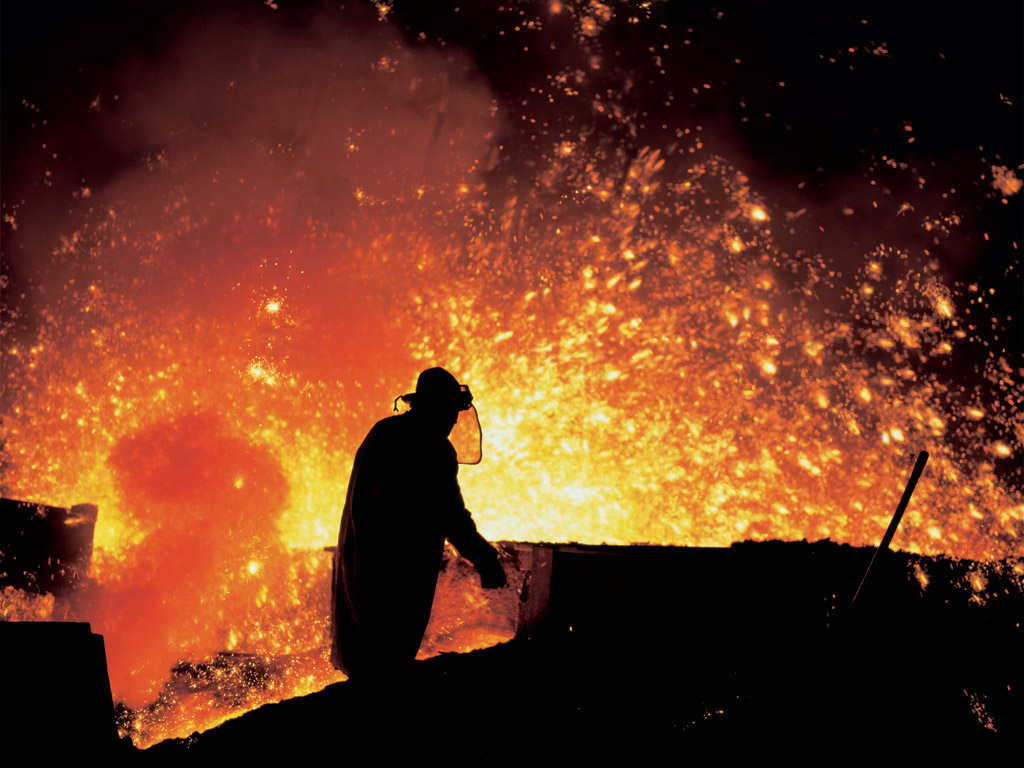
Blast furnaces of Třinec Iron and Steel Works

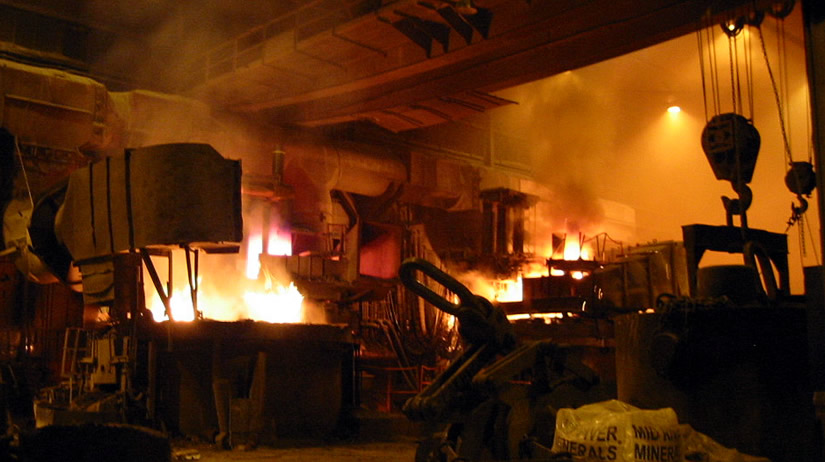
Interior of a steel mill

An integrated steel mill has all the functions for primary steel production:

- iron making (conversion of ore to liquid iron),
- steel making (conversion of pig iron to liquid steel),
- casting (solidification of the liquid steel),
- roughing rolling/billet rolling (reducing size of blocks)
- product rolling (finished shapes).

The principal raw materials for an integrated mill are iron ore, limestone, and coal (or coke). These materials are charged in batches into a blast furnace where the iron compounds in the ore give up excess oxygen and become liquid iron. At intervals of a few hours, the accumulated liquid iron is tapped from the blast furnace and either cast into pig iron or directed to other vessels for further steel making operations. Historically the Bessemer process was a major advancement in the production of economical steel, but it has now been entirely replaced by other processes such as the basic oxygen furnace.

Molten steel is cast into large blocks called blooms. During the casting process various methods are used, such as addition of aluminum, so that impurities in the steel float to the surface where they can be cut off the finished bloom.

Because of the energy cost and structural stress associated with heating and cooling a blast furnace, typically these primary steel making vessels will operate on a continuous production campaign of several years duration. Even during periods of low steel demand, it may not be feasible to let the blast furnace grow cold, though some adjustment of the production rate is possible.

Integrated mills are large facilities that are typically only economical to build in 2,000,000-ton per year annual capacity and up. Final products made by an integrated plant are usually large structural sections, heavy plate, strip, wire rod, railway rails, and occasionally long products such as bars and pipe.

A major environmental hazard associated with integrated steel mills is the pollution produced in the manufacture of coke, which is an essential intermediate product in the reduction of iron ore in a blast furnace.

Integrated mills may also adopt some of the processes used in mini-mills, such as arc furnaces and direct casting, to reduce production costs.

== Minimill ==
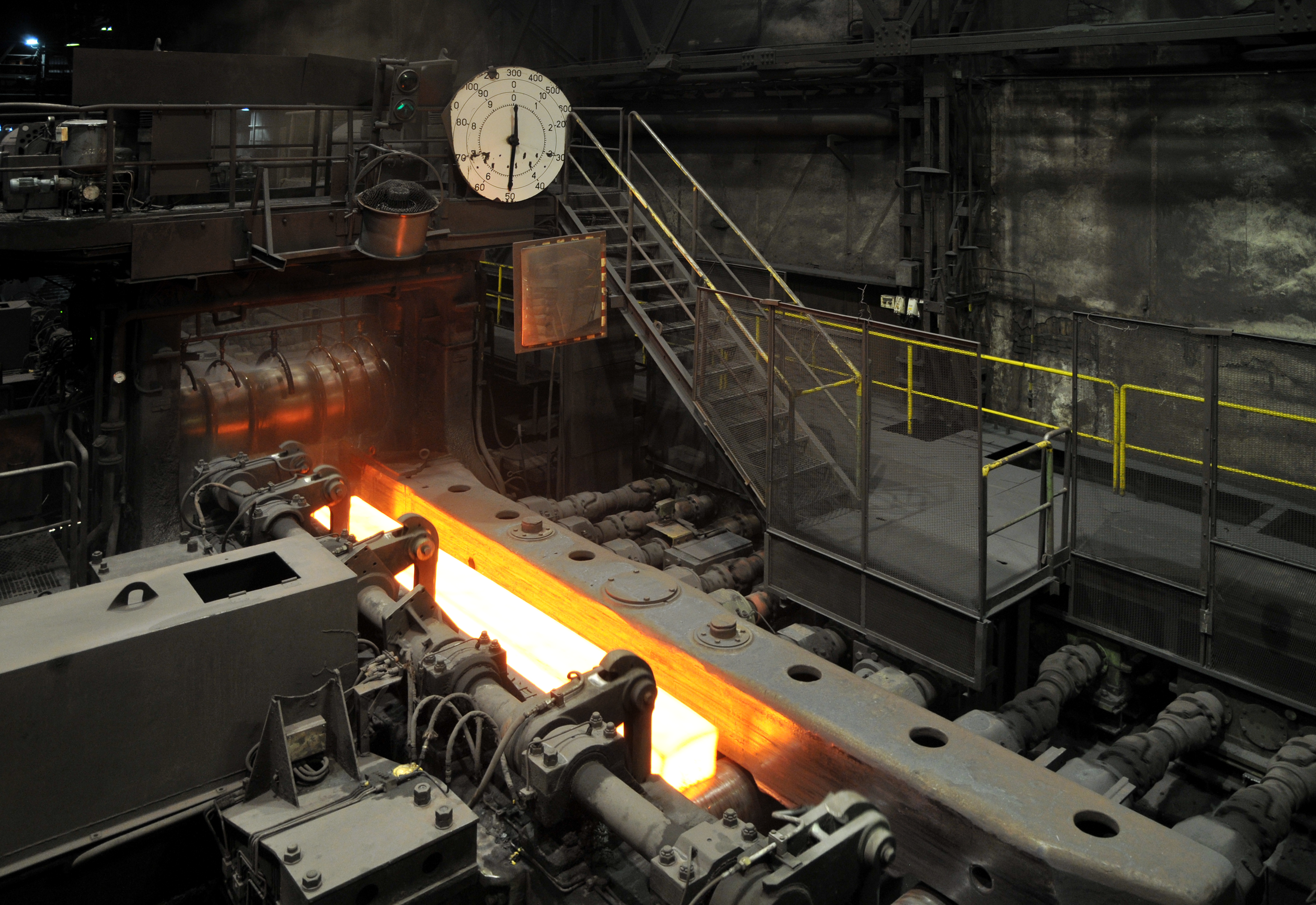
A billet of steel entering a rolling mill

A minimill is traditionally a secondary steel producer; however, Nucor (one of the world's largest steel producers) and Commercial Metals Company (CMC) use minimills exclusively. Usually it obtains most of its iron from scrap steel, recycled from used automobiles and equipment or byproducts of manufacturing. Direct reduced iron (DRI) is sometimes used with scrap, to help maintain desired chemistry of the steel, though usually DRI is too expensive to use as the primary raw steelmaking material. A typical mini-mill will have an electric arc furnace for scrap melting, a ladle furnace or vacuum furnace for precision control of chemistry, a strip or billet continuous caster for converting molten steel to solid form, a reheat furnace and a rolling mill.

Originally the minimill was adapted to production of bar products only, such as concrete reinforcing bar, flats, angles, channels, pipe, and light rails. Since the late 1980s, successful introduction of the direct strip casting process has made minimill production of strip feasible. Often a minimill will be constructed in an area with no other steel production, to take advantage of local markets, resources, or lower-cost labour. Minimill plants may specialize, for example, in making coils of rod for wire-drawing use, or pipe, or in special sections for transportation and agriculture.

Capacities of minimills vary: some plants may make as much as 3,000,000 tons per year, a typical size is in the range 200,000 to 400,000 tons per year, and some old or specialty plants may make as little as 50,000 tons per year of finished product. Nucor Corporation, for example, annually produces around 9,100,000 tons of sheet steel from its four sheet mills, 6,700,000 tons of bar steel from its 10 bar mills and 2,100,000 tons of plate steel from its two plate mills.

Since the electric arc furnace can be easily started and stopped on a regular basis, minimills can follow the market demand for their products easily, operating on 24-hour schedules when demand is high and cutting back production when sales are lower.

== See also ==
- Foundry
- List of steel producers
- Steel § Industry
