= United States Office of War Information =

US government agency during World War II

Office of War Information
- OWI

Agency overview
- Formed: June 13, 1942; 84 years ago
- Preceding agencies: Office of Facts and Figures; Office of Government Reports; Division of Information; Committee on Public Information (WWI)
- Dissolved: September 15, 1945; 81 years ago
- Superseding agencies: State; USIS, Office of Strategic Services, Central Intelligence Agency
- Jurisdiction: United States Government
- Headquarters: Washington, D.C., United States
- Parent agency: Office for Emergency Management
- Child agencies: Foreign Information Service; Bureau of Intelligence; Psychological Warfare Branch; Book and Magazine Bureau, Extensive Surveys Division, Bureau of Public Inquiries, Bureau of Motion Pictures, Propaganda Intelligence Section, etc.

The United States Office of War Information (OWI) was a United States government agency created during World War II. The OWI operated from June 1942 until September 1945. Through radio broadcasts, newspapers, posters, photographs, films and other forms of media, the OWI was the connection between the battlefront and civilian communities. The office also established several overseas branches, which launched a large-scale information and propaganda campaign abroad. From 1942 to 1945, the OWI reviewed film scripts, flagging material which portrayed the United States in a negative light, including anti-war sentiment.

== History ==
=== Origins ===
President Franklin D. Roosevelt promulgated the OWI on June 13, 1942, by Executive Order 9182. The Executive Order consolidated the functions of the Office of Facts and Figures (OFF, OWI's direct predecessor), the Office of Government Reports, and the Division of Information of the Office for Emergency Management. The Foreign Information Service, a division of the Office of the Coordinator of Information, became the core of the Overseas Branch of the OWI.

At the onset of World War II, the American public was in the dark regarding wartime information. One American observer noted: "It all seemed to boil down to three bitter complaints...first, that there was too much information; second, that there wasn't enough of it; and third, that in any event it was confusing and inconsistent". Further, the American public confessed a lack of understanding as to why the world was at war, and held great resentment against other Allied Nations. President Roosevelt established the OWI to both meet the demands for news and less confusion, as well as resolve American apathy towards the war.

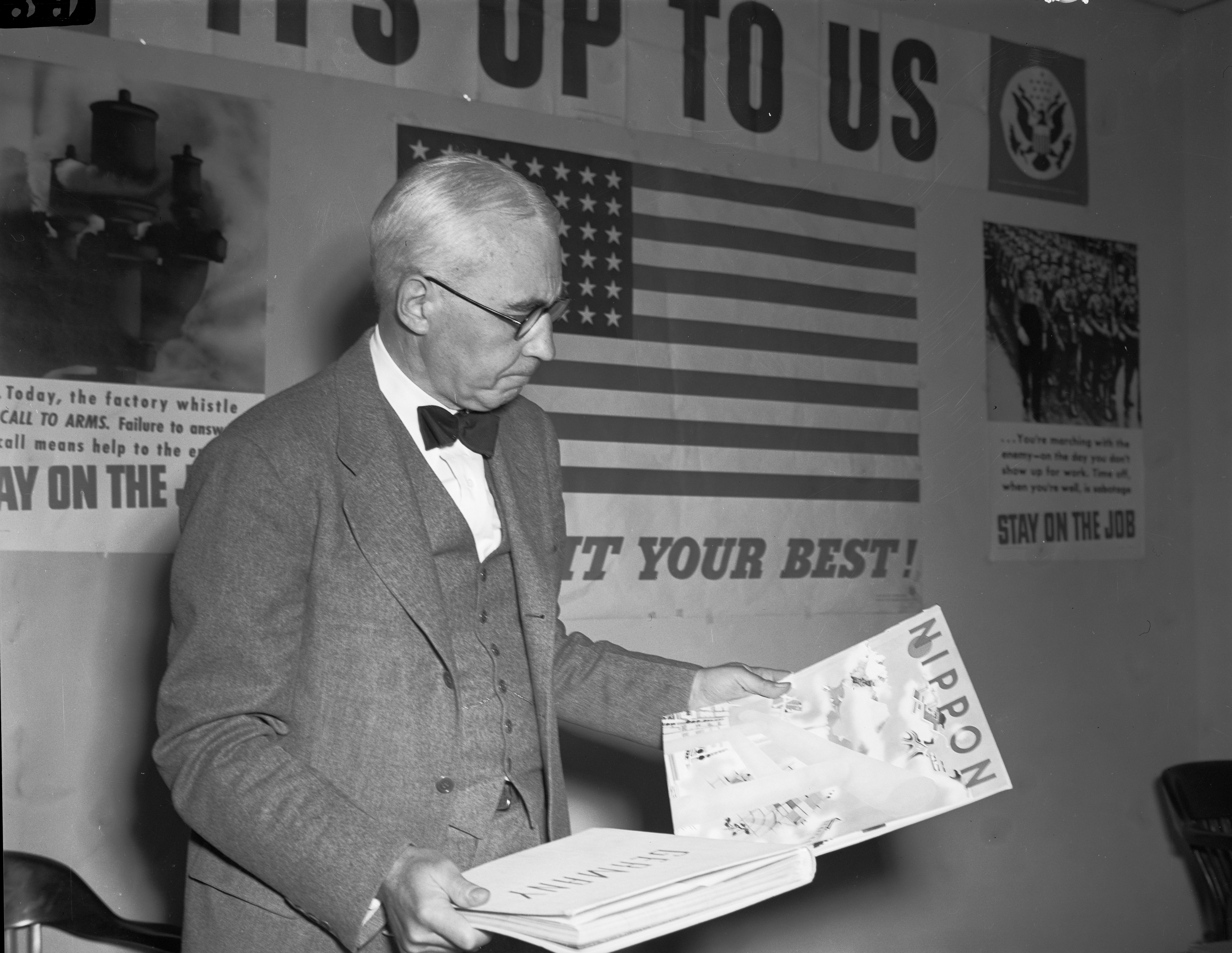
Elmer Davis, Director of the Office of War Information, examines Nazi and Japanese propaganda organs at a press conference that explained how the OWI was fighting the propaganda war (March 6, 1943).

The OWI's creation was not without controversy. The American public, and the United States Congress in particular, were wary of propaganda for several reasons. First, the press feared a centralized agency as the sole distributor of wartime information. Second, Congress feared an American propaganda machine that could resemble Joseph Goebbels' operation in Nazi Germany. Third, previous attempts at propaganda under the Committee on Public Information/Creel Committee during WWI were viewed as a failure. And fourth, the American public favored an isolationist or non-interventionist policy and were therefore hesitant to support a pro-war propaganda campaign targeting Americans.

But in the wake of the attack on Pearl Harbor, the need for coordinated and properly disseminated wartime information from the military/administration to the public outweighed the fears associated with American propaganda. President Roosevelt entrusted the OWI to journalist and CBS newsman Elmer Davis, with the mission to take "an active part in winning the war and in laying the foundations for a better postwar world".

President Roosevelt ordered Davis to "formulate and carry out, through the use of press, radio, motion picture, and other facilities, information programs designed to facilitate the development of an informed and intelligent understanding, at home and abroad, of the status and progress of the war effort and of the war policies, activities, and aims of the Government". The OWI's operations were thus divided between the Domestic and Overseas Branches.

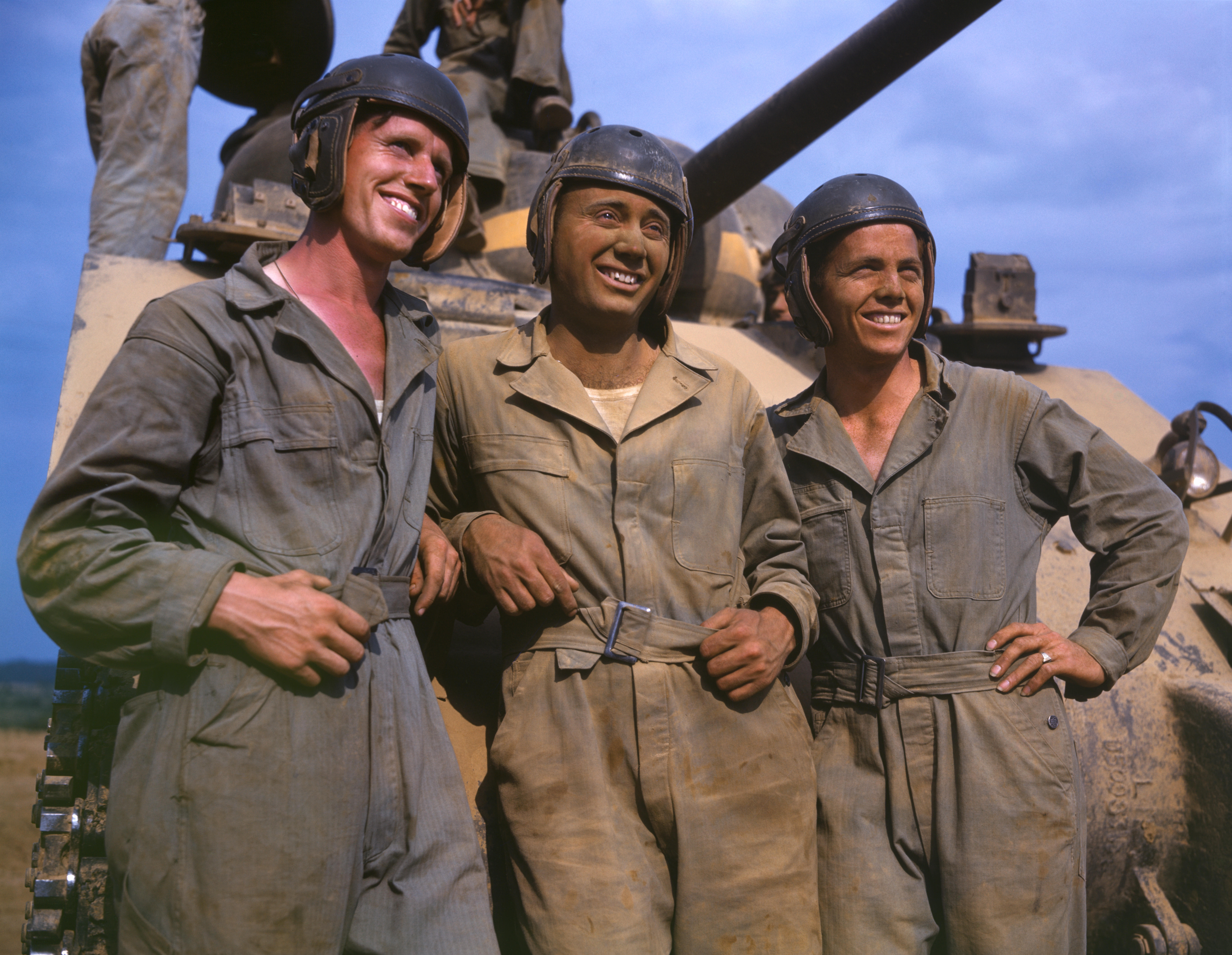
A M-4 tank crew. OWI photo taken by Alfred T. Palmer, 1942.

=== Domestic operations ===
The OWI Domestic Radio Bureau produced series such as This is Our Enemy (spring 1942), which dealt with Germany, Japan, and Italy; Uncle Sam, which dealt with domestic themes; and Hasten the Day (August 1943), which focused on the Home Front, the NBC Blue Network's Chaplain Jim. The radio producer Norman Corwin produced several series for the OWI, including An American in England, An American in Russia, and Passport for Adams, which starred Robert Young, Ray Collins, Paul Stewart and Harry Davenport.

Washington, D.C. Radio repair service in the self-help exchange. Photo taken by John Collier Jr., January 1942.

In 1942 the OWI established the Voice of America (VOA), which remains in service as the official government international broadcasting service of the United States. The VOA initially borrowed transmitters from the commercial networks. The programs OWI produced included those provided by the Labor Short Wave Bureau, whose material came from the American Federation of Labor and the Congress of Industrial Organizations.

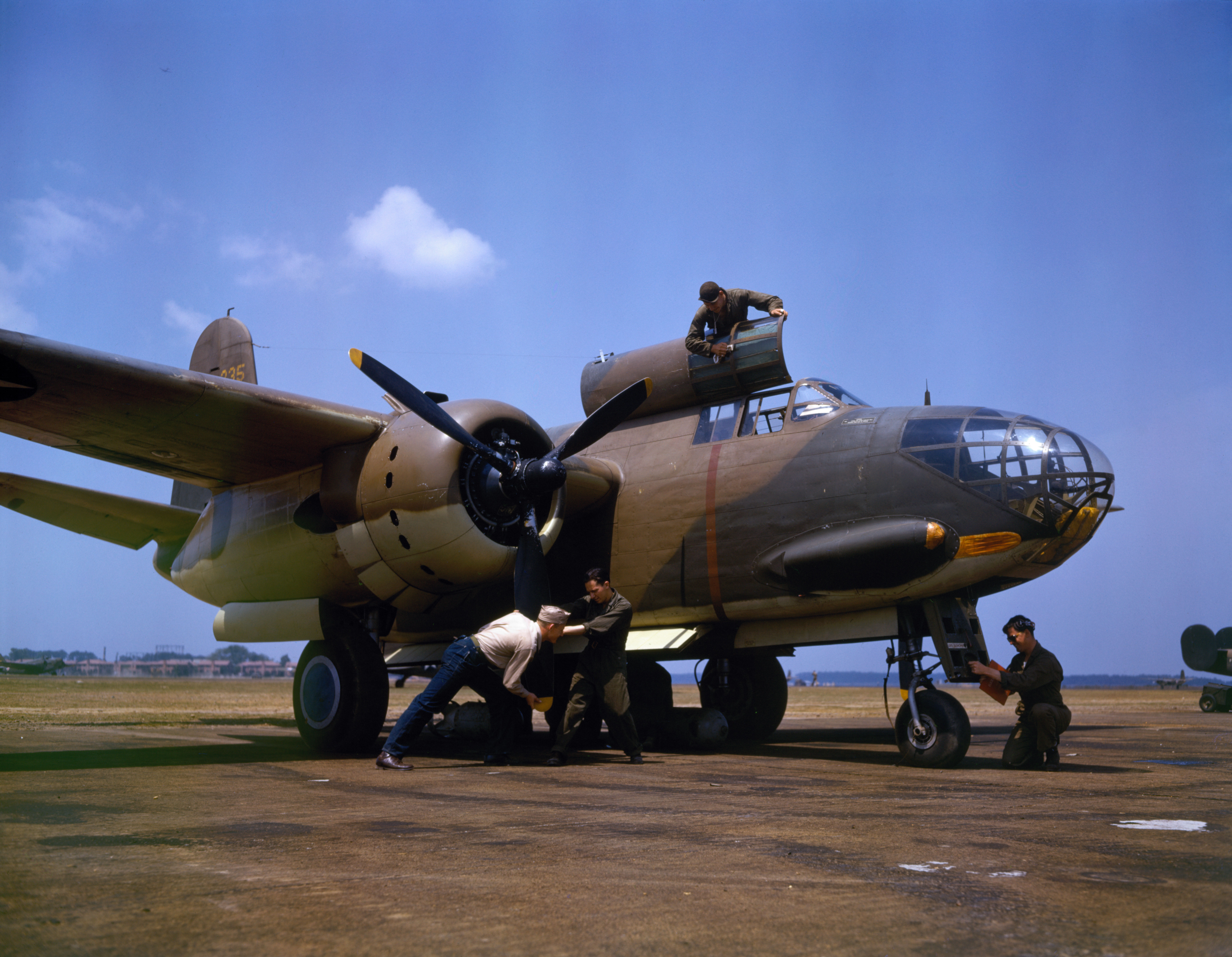
Servicing a Douglas A-20 Havoc bomber. OWI photo taken by Alfred T. Palmer, 1942.

In conjunction with the War Relocation Authority, the OWI produced a series of documentary films related to the internment of Japanese Americans. Japanese Relocation and several other films were designed by Milton S. Eisenhower to educate the general public on the internment, to counter the tide of anti-Japanese sentiment in the country, and to encourage Japanese-American internees to resettle outside camp or to enter military service. The OWI also worked with camp newspapers to disseminate information to internees.

During 1942 and 1943 the OWI boasted two photographic units whose photographers documented the country's mobilization during the early years of the war, concentrating on such topics as aircraft factories and women in the workforce. In addition, the OWI produced a series of 267 newsreels in 16 mm film, The United Newsreel which were shown overseas and to US audiences. These newsreels incorporated U.S. military footage. For examples see this Google list.

=== Bureau of Motion Pictures ===
The OWI Bureau of Motion Pictures (BMP) headed by Lowell Mellet worked with the Hollywood movie studios to produce films that advanced American war aims. According to Elmer Davis, "The easiest way to inject a propaganda idea into most people's minds is to let it go through the medium of an entertainment picture when they do not realize that they are being propagandized." Successful films depicted the Allied armed forces as valiant "Freedom fighters", and advocated for civilian participation, such as conserving fuel or donating food to troops.

The BMP's first act was the creation and distribution of a "Manual for the Motion-Picture Industry" this provided guidance on how to promote Anti-Fascist democratic principles. The influence of this was limited and instead they began to request scripts to review and approve. By 1943 every major Hollywood studio (except Paramount Pictures) allowed the OWI to examine their film scripts. OWI evaluated whether each film would promote the honor of the Allies' mission. Unlike the office of the Production Code whose approval was required for major studio releases, the OWI's role was advisory, and they lacked the power to prevent films from release. However, the Office of Censorship could deny a film an export license.

The BMP created documentaries and training films for soldiers. Their first release was The World At War, produced and edited by Sam Spewack. The Why We Fight series directed by Frank Capra was shown to American soldiers to explain and justify America's involvement in the war. By July 1942 OWI administrators realized that the best way to reach American audiences was to present war films in conjunction with feature films and some documentaries such as Why We Fight received theatrical release.

=== Bureau of Overseas Intelligence ===
The Bureau of Overseas Intelligence was formed in August 1943. It replaced the Bureau of Research and Analysis.

=== Foreign operations ===
The Overseas Branch enjoyed greater success and less controversy than the Domestic Branch. Abroad, the OWI operated a Psychological Warfare Branch (PWB), which used propaganda to terrorize enemy forces in combat zones, in addition to informing civilian populations in Allied camps. Leaflet warfare gained popularity during World War II and was utilized in regions such as Northern Africa, Italy, Germany, the Philippines, and Japan. For example, in Japan, the OWI printed and dropped over 180 million leaflets, with about 98 million being dropped in the summer months of 1945. Leaflets dropped in Tunisia read: "You Are Surrounded" and "Drowning Is a Nasty Death". Millions of leaflets dropped in Sicily read: "The time has come for you to decide whether Italians shall die for Mussolini and Hitler – or live for Italy and civilization".

OWI also used newspapers and publicized magazines to further American war aims. Magazines distributed to foreign audiences, such as Victory, intended to convey to foreign Allied civilians that American civilians were contributing to the war. Victory showcased America's manufacturing power, and sought to foster an appreciation for the American lifestyle.

Aside from the aforementioned publication and production styles of propaganda, the OWI also utilized unconventional propaganda vehicles known as "specialty items." Specific examples of these items include packets of seeds, matchbooks, soap paper, and sewing kits. The packets of seeds had an American flag and a message printed on the outside that identified the donor. Each matchbook was inscribed with the "Four Freedoms" on the inside cover. Soap paper was etched with the message: "From your friends the United Nations. Dip in water – use like soap. WASH OFF THE NAZI DIRT." Sewing kit pincushions were shaped like a human rear end. On the reverse side lay a caricatured face of either Adolf Hitler or Japanese General Hideki Tojo.

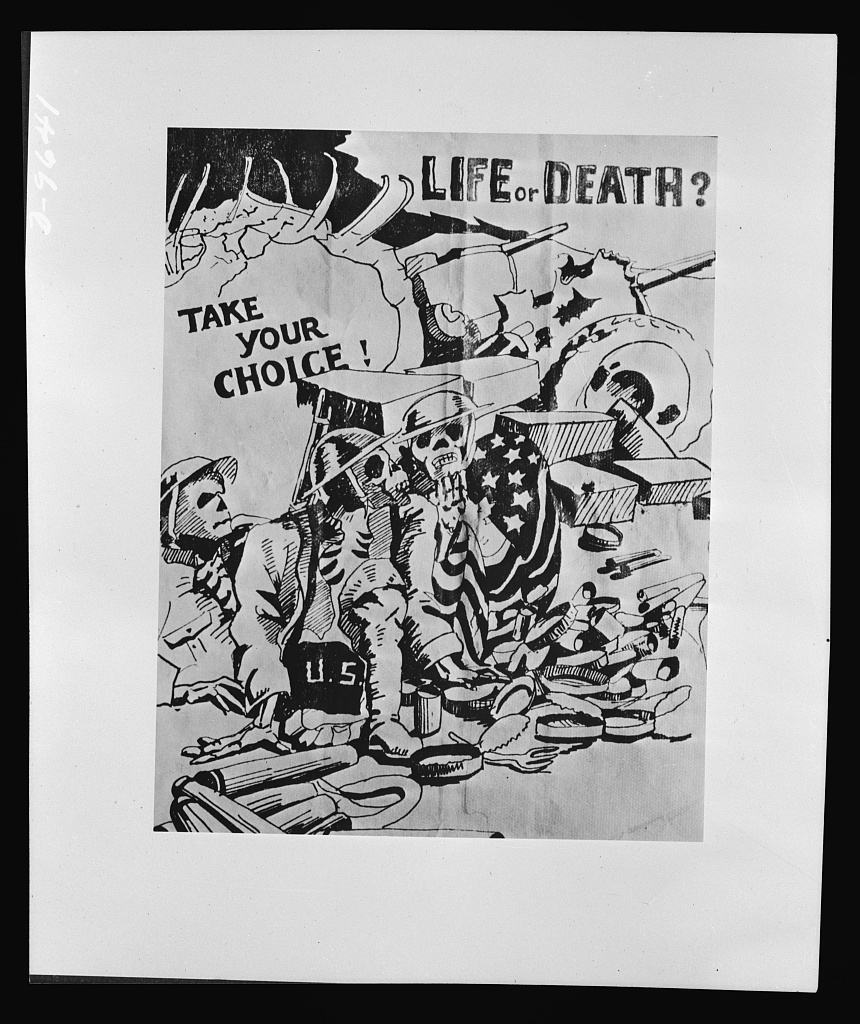
Death unless you surrender. Here is an OWI leaflet giving Japan's ultimatum to the Filipino people. In reply, the Filipinos threw their entire resources and manpower into the struggle on the side of the United States.

The details of OWI's involvement can be divided into operations in the European and Pacific Theaters.

==== European Theater ====
One of the most astounding of all OWI operations occurred in Luxembourg. Known as Operation Annie, the United States 12th Army Group ran a secret radio station from 2:00–6:30 am every morning from a house in Luxembourg pretending to be loyal Rhinelanders under Nazi occupation. They spoke of Nazi commanders hiding their desperate position from the German public, which caused dissent among Nazi supporters. Further, they led Nazi forces into an Allied trap, and then staged an Allied attack on the Annie Radio office to maintain their cover.

On the Eastern front, the OWI struggled not to offend Polish and Soviet Allies. As the Soviets advanced from the East towards Germany, they swept through Poland without hesitation. However, Poles considered much of the land of the Eastern front as their own. The OWI struggled to present the news (including the pronunciation of town names or and discussion of county or national boundaries) without offending either party. Further, Poles and Soviets criticized the OWI for promoting the idealization of war, when their physical and human losses so heavily outweighed that of America's.

==== Pacific Theater ====
The OWI was one of the most prolific sources of propaganda in "Free China." They operated a sophisticated propaganda machine that sought to demoralize the Japanese army and create a portrait of US war aims that would appeal to the Chinese audience. OWI employed many Chinese, second-generation Japanese (Nisei), Japanese POWs, Korean exiles, etc. to help gather and translate information, as well as transmit programs in multiple languages across the Pacific. OWI also created communication channels (logistical support) for intelligence and coded information.

However, the OWI encountered public relations difficulties in China and India. In China, the OWI unsuccessfully attempted to stay removed from the Nationalist versus Communist conflict. However, the Roosevelt administration and OWI officials took issue with many aspects of Chiang Kai-shek's rule, and conversely, Chiang placed spies in the OWI. Also, the OWI struggled to paint a post-war image of China without offending Nationalist or Communist leaders. In India, the Americans and British agreed to win the war first, then deal with (de)colonization. The OWI feared that broadcasts advocating liberty from oppression would incite India rebellions and jeopardize cooperation with the British. But this approach angered Indians as well as the African-American lobby at home who recognized the hypocrisy in American policy.

=== Controversies at home ===
From 1942 to 1945, the OWI's Bureau of Motion Pictures reviewed 1,652 film scripts and revised or discarded any that portrayed the United States in a negative light, including material that made Americans seem "oblivious to the war or anti-war." Elmer Davis, the head of the OWI, said that "The easiest way to inject a propaganda idea into most people's minds is to let it go through the medium of an entertainment picture when they do not realize they're being propagandized".

The OWI suffered from conflicting aims and poor management. For instance, Elmer Davis, who wanted to "see that the American people are truthfully informed," clashed with the military that routinely withheld information for "public safety". Further, OWI employees grew ever more dissatisfied with "what they regarded as a turn away from the fundamental, complex issues of the war in favor of manipulation and stylized exhortation". On April 14, 1943, several OWI writers resigned from office and released a scathing statement to the press explaining how they no longer felt they could give an objective picture of the war because "high-pressure promoters who prefer slick salesmanship to honest information" dictated OWI decision-making. President Roosevelt's "wait-and-see" attitude and wavering public support for OWI damaged public opinion of the agency.

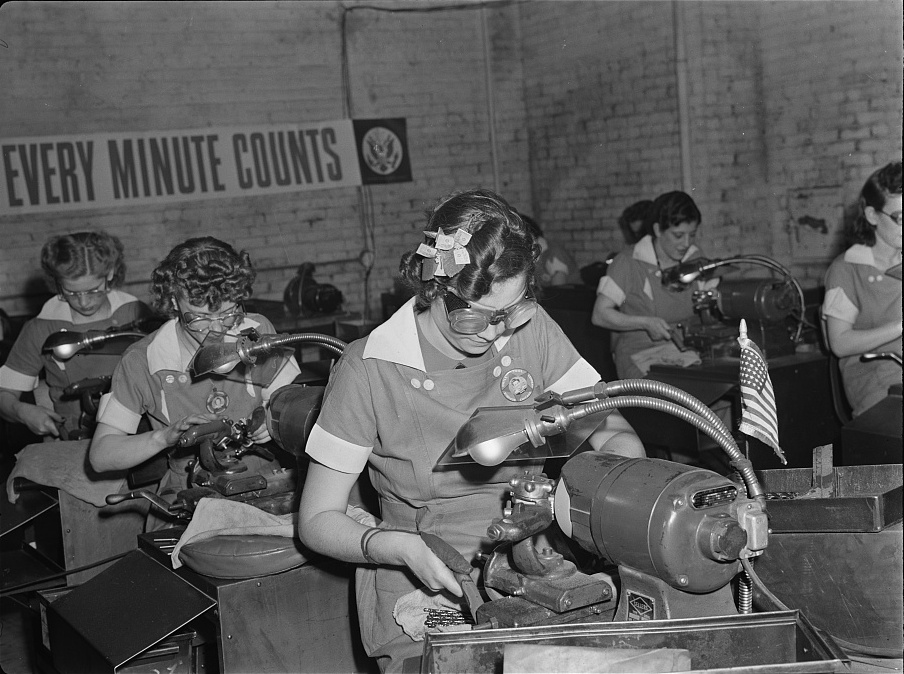
Rosie the Riveter: Women at machines, sharpening drill bits, Republic Drill and Tool Company, Chicago. Photo taken by Ann Rosener, August 1942.

Congressional opposition to the domestic operations of the OWI resulted in increasingly curtailed funds. Congress accused the OWI as President Roosevelt's campaign agency, and pounced on any miscommunications and scandals as reason for disbandment. In 1943, the OWI's appropriations were cut out of the following year's budget and only restored with strict restrictions on OWI's domestic capabilities. Many overseas branch offices were closed, as well as the Motion Picture Bureau. By 1944 the OWI operated mostly in the foreign field, contributing to undermining enemy morale. The agency was abolished in 1945, and many of its foreign functions were transferred to the Department of State.

Some of the writers, producers, and actors of OWI programs admired the Soviet Union and were either loosely affiliated with or were members of the Communist Party USA. The director of Pacific operations for the OWI, Owen Lattimore, who later accompanied U.S. Vice-President Henry Wallace on a mission to China and Mongolia in 1944, was later alleged to be a Soviet agent on the basis of testimony by a defector from the Soviet GRU, General Alexander Barmine.

In his final report, Elmer Davis noted that he had fired 35 employees, because of past Communist associations, though the FBI files showed no formal allegiance to the CPUSA. After the war, as a broadcast journalist, Davis staunchly defended Lattimore and others from what he considered outrageous and false accusations of disloyalty from Senator Joseph R. McCarthy, Whittaker Chambers and others. Flora Wovschin, who worked for the OWI from September 1943 to February 1945, was later revealed in the Venona project intercepts to have been a Soviet spy.

=== Dissolution and legacy ===
The OWI was terminated, effective September 15, 1945, by Executive Order 9608 on August 31, 1945. President Truman cited the OWI for "outstanding contribution to victory", and saw no reason to continue funding the agency post-war. The international offices of the OWI were transferred to the State Department, and the United States Information Service and the Office of Strategic Services/Central Intelligence Agency assumed many of the information gathering, analyzing, and disseminating responsibilities.

Despite its troubled existence, the OWI is widely considered to be influential in the Allied victory and mobilizing American support for the war domestically.

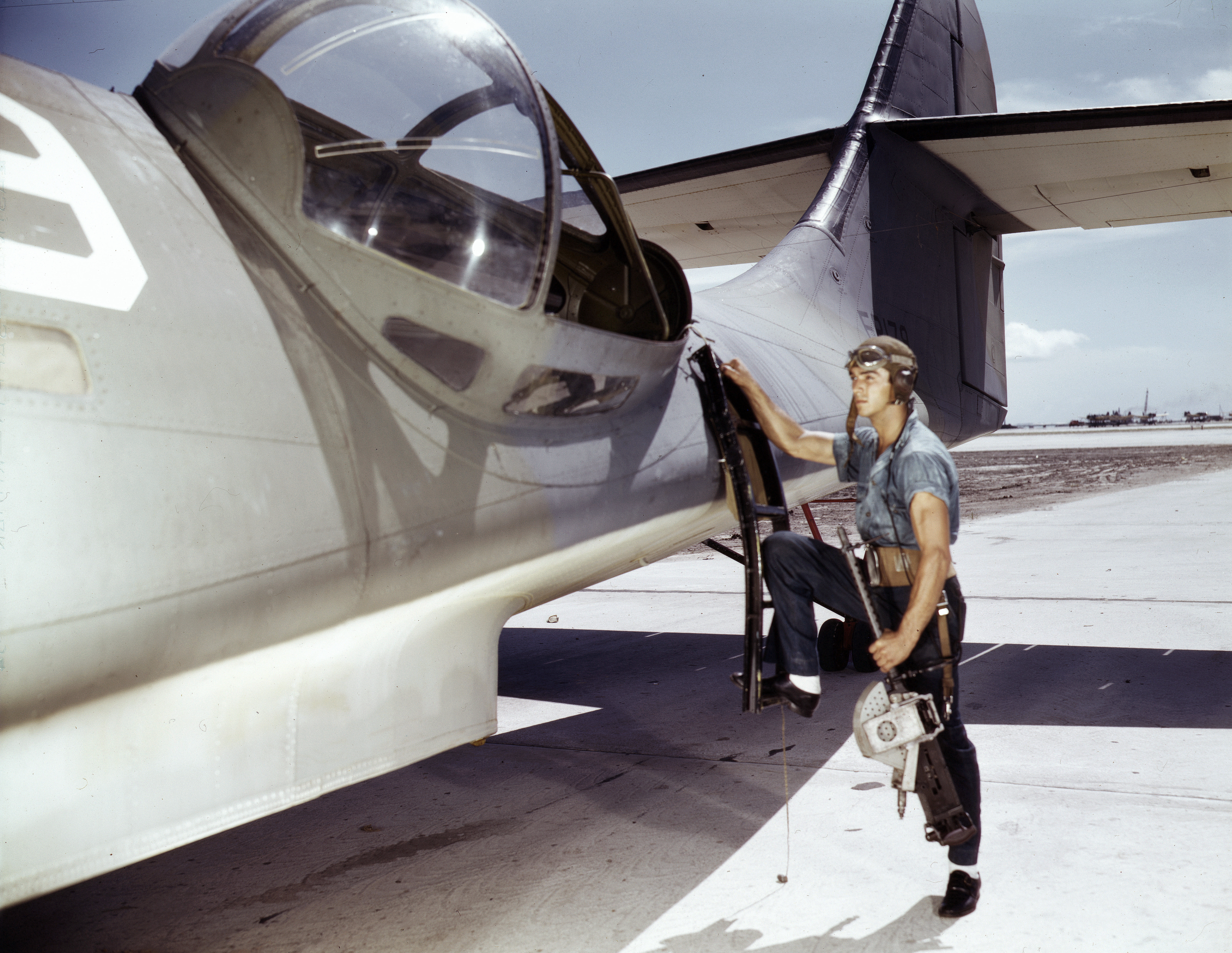
An Aviation Ordnanceman stationed at the Naval Air Station Corpus Christi installing a M1919 Browning machine gun on a PBY Catalina. Photo taken by Howard R. Hollem, August 1942.

== People ==
See Category:People of the United States Office of War Information

== Collections ==
The Records of the Office of War Information are held in the US National Archives and Records Administration. The Library of Congress holds color photographs and black and white negatives from the OWI, many of which have been digitised. Collections relating to the OWI include:

- Barton Cummings Papers at the National Museum of American History
- Educational Film Strips and Notes Collection at University College London Special Collections
- Edward P. Lilly Papers at the Eisenhower Library
- OWI images at the Museum of the City of New York
- Office of War Information miscellaneous records, 1941-1945 at Hoover Institution, Stanford University
- Princeton University Poster Collection (including OWI posters) at the National Museum of American History
- Paul Sturman Papers at the Eisenhower Library
- Fred S. Rosenau Papers at the National Museum of American History
- Armitage Watkins papers on the Office of War Information, 1941-1948 at Columbia University Library
- World War Poster collection at University of Texas Libraries

== Filmography ==
- This is Our Enemy
- Hasten the Day
- An American in England
- An American in Russia
- Japanese Relocation (1942)
- Chaplain Jim
- Passport for Adams
- The Autobiography of a 'Jeep' (1943)

== See also ==
- Frank Shozo Baba
- Committee on Public Information
