= Steve Brackenridge =

English footballer

Personal information
- Full name: Stephen James Brackenridge
- Date of birth: 31 July 1984 (age 42)
- Place of birth: Rochdale, England
- Position: Right midfielder

Team information
- Current team: New Mills

Senior career*
Years	Team	Apps	(Gls)
2001–2005	Macclesfield Town	9	(2)
2005–2007	Hyde United	42	(7)
2007	Mossley	12	(1)
2007–2009	Salford City	?	(?)
2009–	New Mills	?	(?)
- * Club domestic league appearances and goals

Stephen James Brackenridge (born 31 July 1984) is an English professional footballer who plays as a right midfielder for New Mills. He played for Macclesfield Town in the Football League.
