= Donald Breckenridge =

American businessman (1932–2005)

Donald Breckenridge (1932 – November 30, 2005) was founder and president of Breckenridge Hotels Corporation. Over the course of 43 years, he oversaw the building of 43 hotels in 11 US states, including the Breckenridge Pavilion, now the Pavilion Hotel, in St. Louis, Missouri.

He was a board member of more than 30 civic organizations, including the Variety Club, the local Muscular Dystrophy Association and the St. Louis Visitors and Convention Commission.

Breckenridge was married to his wife, Diane Breckenridge, for 35 years, and they had six children. He died at the age of 73 on 30 November 2005, one year after being diagnosed with lung cancer.
