= Cooper Township, Sangamon County, Illinois =

Coordinates: 39°44′38″N 89°26′24″W

Cooper Township
- Township
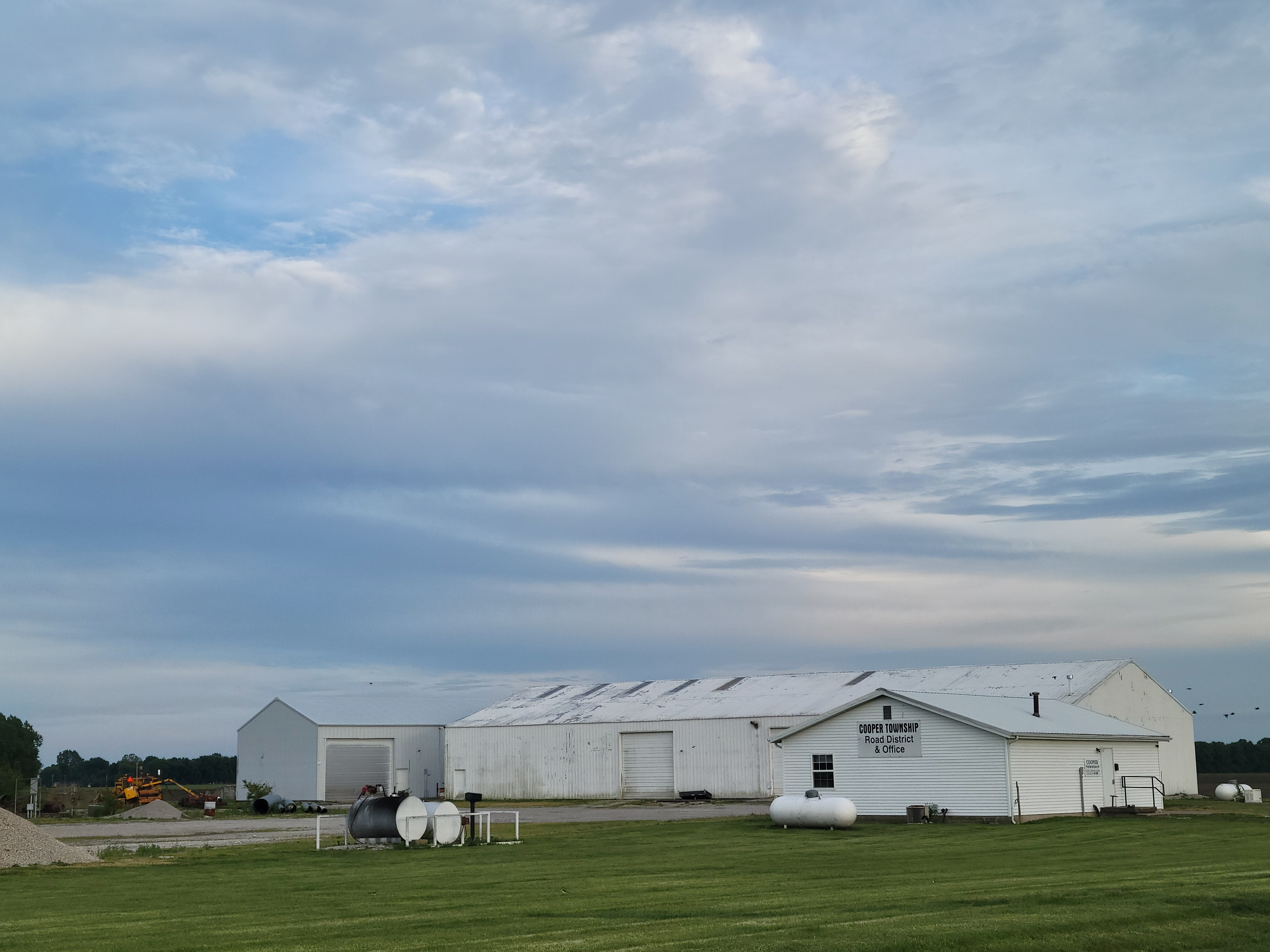
- Cooper Township government building near Berry

- Location in Sangamon County

- Sangamon County's location in Illinois
- Country: United States
- State: Illinois
- County: Sangamon
- Established: November 6, 1860

Area
  - Total: 28.72 sq mi (74.4 km^{2})
  - Land: 28.53 sq mi (73.9 km^{2})
  - Water: 0.19 sq mi (0.49 km^{2}) 0.66%

Population (2010)
  - Estimate (2016): 882
  - Density: 31.3/sq mi (12.1/km^{2})
- Time zone: UTC-6 (CST)
  - Summer (DST): UTC-5 (CDT)
- FIPS code: 17-167-16223

Cooper Township is a rural township in Sangamon County, Illinois, covering about 28.7 square miles, almost all of which is land, and home to 758 residents as of 2020. It is a small community with an older population, strong homeownership, high educational attainment, and income levels above state and national averages.

== Geography ==
According to the 2010 census, the township has a total area of 28.72 square miles (74.4 km^{2}), of which 28.53 square miles (73.9 km^{2}) (or 99.34%) is land and 0.19 square miles (0.49 km^{2}) (or 0.66%) is water.

== Demographics ==
According to the 2020 U.S. Census, Cooper Township in Sangamon County, Illinois, had a population of 758 residents, reflecting a small and predominantly rural community spread across roughly 28.5 square miles. This results in a low population density typical of the region. More recent American Community Survey estimates indicate that the township has an older population profile, with a median age of 46.8, which is higher than both the county and state averages. Household size in the township averages about 2.5 persons, and roughly 300 households make up the local population base, consistent with demographic patterns reported in rural central Illinois.

Economically, Cooper Township shows signs of relative affluence within rural central Illinois. Per-capita income is about $47,458, while median household income reaches $127,976, well above state and national medians. Housing patterns support this picture: nearly all occupied homes are owner-occupied, and the median home value is approximately $253,500, suggesting a stable and well-established residential base.

Labor force participation is relatively high for a rural area, with an estimated 66% of adults engaged in the workforce, and unemployment rates remain below state and national averages.

Educational attainment is also comparatively strong. All adults in the township have at least a high school diploma, and roughly 38.3% hold a bachelor's degree or higher, slightly exceeding broader county and statewide figures: a level of attainment consistent with nearby suburban and exurban areas influenced by the greater Springfield labor and education.
