= Breckenridge, Sangamon County, Illinois =

Breckenridge, Illinois
- Unincorporated community
- Location within Illinois Location within the United States
- Coordinates: 39°41′56″N 89°26′51″W
- Country: United States
- State: Illinois
- County: Sangamon
- Elevation: 587 ft (179 m)
- Time zone: UTC-6 (Central (CST))
  - Summer (DST): UTC-5 (CDT)
- Area code: 217
- GNIS feature ID: 422497

Breckenridge is an unincorporated community in Cooper Township, Sangamon County, Illinois, United States. Breckenridge is located on Illinois Route 29, 4.2 miles (6.8 km) northwest of Edinburg.
