= Breckinridge =

Breckinridge may refer to:

== People ==
- Breckinridge (surname)
- Breckinridge family
- Marvin Breckinridge Patterson (1905–2002), American photojournalist, cinematographer, and philanthropist
- Benjamin Breckinridge Warfield (1851–1921), principal of Princeton Seminary from 1887 to 1921
- Breckinridge Long (1881–1958), United States ambassador to Italy
- Bobby Breckinridge, fictional character in Degrassi
- John Breckinridge Castleman (1841–1918), military officer and prominent landowner and businessman in Louisville, Kentucky
- John C. Breckinridge (1821-1875), senator from Kentucky, fourteenth Vice President of the United States, and later Confederate general and the last Confederate Secretary of War
- Robert Breckinridge McAfee (1784–1849), Kentucky politician, and seventh Lieutenant Governor of Kentucky
- James Breckenridge Speed (1844–1912), businessman and philanthropist in Louisville, Kentucky

== Places ==
In the United States:

- Breckenridge, Colorado, originally spelled "Breckinridge", renamed during the Civil War
- Breckinridge County, Kentucky
- Breckinridge Center, Kentucky

== Things ==
- Breckinridge House, a dormitory at the University of Chicago named for Sophonisba Breckinridge
- Myra Breckinridge, a satirical novel by Gore Vidal written in the form of a diary
- Myra Breckinridge (film), cinematic version of Vidal's novel
- USS Breckinridge (DD-148), a Wickes class destroyer in the United States Navy, named for Joseph Breckinridge

== See also ==
- Brackenridge (disambiguation)
- Breckenridge (disambiguation)
