= Raymond Breakenridge =

American politician (1897–1982)

Member of the Iowa House of Representatives from the 28th district
- In office January 10, 1955 – January 11, 1959

Personal details
- Born: Raymond D. Breakenridge; August 17, 1897 Winterset, Iowa, U.S.
- Died: August 4, 1982 (aged 84) Louisiana, U.S.
- Party: Republican
- Spouse: Vera M. Bowen (m. 1918)
- Children: 1
- Occupation: Politician, rancher

Raymond D. Breakenridge (August 17, 1897 – August 4, 1982) was an American rancher and politician who served in the Iowa House of Representatives from 1955 to 1959, representing Iowa's 28th House of Representatives district as a member of the Republican Party.

== Early life, education and career ==
Raymond Breakenridge was the youngest son of James and Helen Breakenridge. He was born in Winterset, Iowa, on August 17, 1897, and attended Winterset High School in his hometown, graduating in 1917. The next year, he married Vera M. Bowen, with whom he had a daughter. Breakenridge ran his own farm from 1919, on which he raised Shorthorn cattle. He was a member of several agricultural organizations as well as the local school board. Breakenridge was elected to the Iowa House of Representatives for the first time in 1954, as a Republican legislator from District 28. Breakenridge won a second consecutive term in 1956, and served until 1959. In retirement, he moved to Louisiana, where he died on August 4, 1982.
