= Brackenridge, Pennsylvania =

Borough in Pennsylvania, US

- Borough
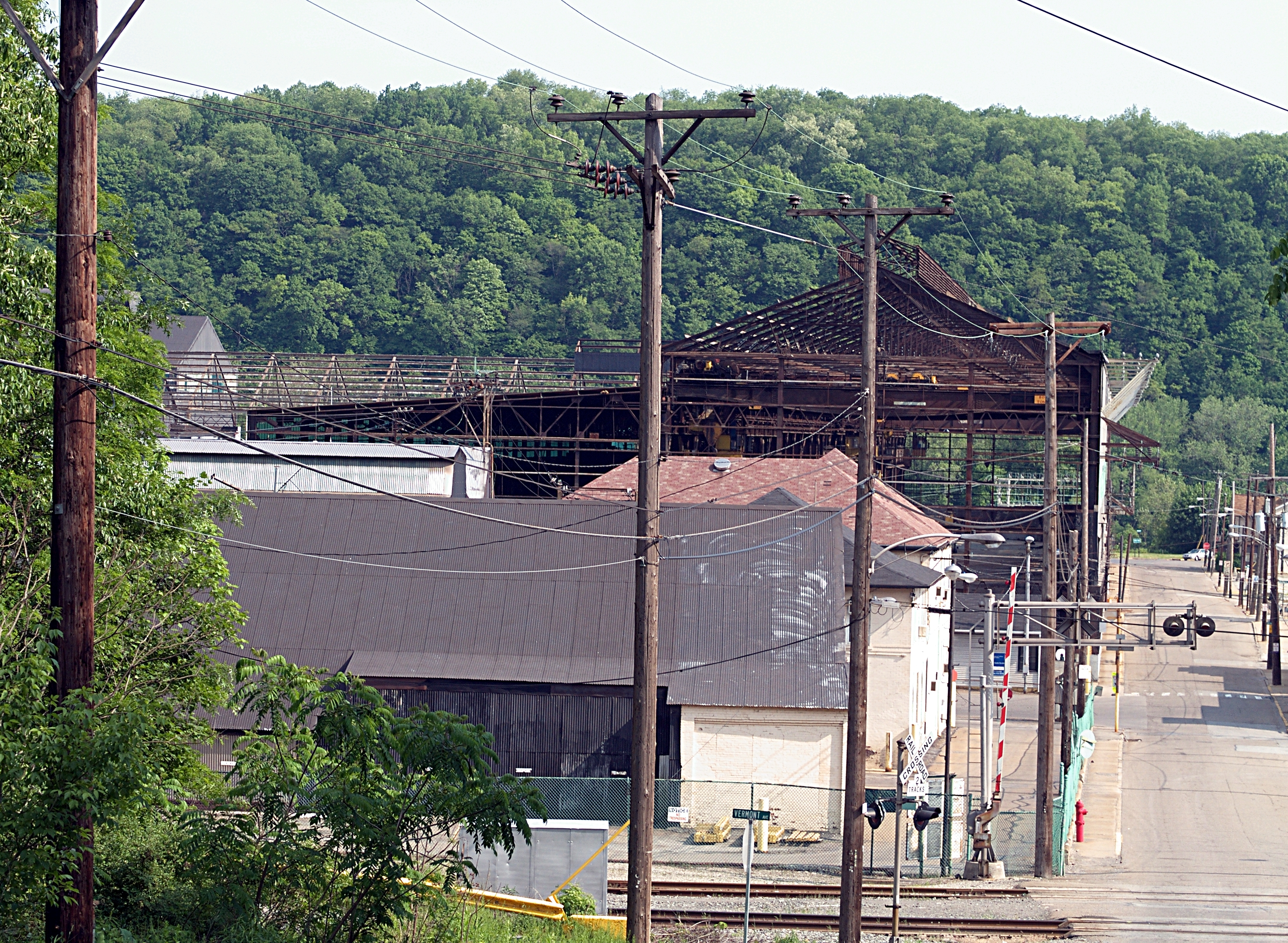
- Brackenridge Works along Mile Lock Lane at Vermont Avenue in Brackenridge
- Etymology: Henry Marie Brackenridge
- Location in Allegheny County and the U.S. state of Pennsylvania

- Location of Pennsylvania in the United States
- Coordinates: 40°36′30″N 79°44′32″W
- Country: United States
- State: Pennsylvania
- County: Allegheny
- Incorporated: September 21, 1901

Government
  - Mayor: Lindsay Fraser

Area
  - Total: 0.56 sq mi (1.45 km^{2})
  - Land: 0.51 sq mi (1.33 km^{2})
  - Water: 0.046 sq mi (0.12 km^{2})
- Elevation: 827 ft (252 m)

Population (2020)
  - Total: 3,240
  - Density: 6,314.0/sq mi (2,437.84/km^{2})
- Time zone: UTC-5 (EST)
  - Summer (DST): UTC-4 (EDT)
- ZIP Code: 15014
- Area code: 724
- FIPS code: 42-07976
- School district: Highlands
- Website: www.brackenridgeboro.com

Brackenridge is a borough in Allegheny County, Pennsylvania, United States, located along the Allegheny River. It is part of the Greater Pittsburgh metropolitan area.

The town is named for Henry Marie Brackenridge. The borough once had glass factories. An Allegheny Technologies steel mill, Allegheny Ludlum Brackenridge Works, plays a prominent role in the community, although most of the facility is located in Harrison Township.

The borough's population stood at 3,421 in 1910 and at 6,400 in 1940. As of the 2020 census, it was 3,240.

== Geography ==
Brackenridge is located at 40°36′30″N 79°44′32″W. The borough's average elevation is 827 feet (252 m) above sea level. According to the U.S. Census Bureau, the borough has a total area of 0.6 square miles (1.6 km^{2}), of which 0.5 square miles (1.3 km^{2}) is land and 0.04 square miles (0.10 km^{2}), or 7.27%, is water.

=== Surrounding and adjacent neighborhoods ===
Brackenridge has two land borders with Tarentum to the west and Harrison Township to the north and east. Across the Allegheny River in Westmoreland County to the south, Brackenridge runs adjacent with Lower Burrell.

== Demographics ==
Historical population
Census	Pop.	Note	%±
1910	3,134		—
1920	4,987		59.1%
1930	6,256		25.4%
1940	6,400		2.3%
1950	6,178		−3.5%
1960	5,697		−7.8%
1970	4,796		−15.8%
1980	4,297		−10.4%
1990	3,784		−11.9%
2000	3,543		−6.4%
2010	3,260		−8.0%
2020	3,240		−0.6%

=== 2020 census ===
As of the 2020 census, Brackenridge had a population of 3,240. The median age was 44.6 years. 18.5% of residents were under the age of 18 and 21.7% of residents were 65 years of age or older. For every 100 females there were 97.6 males, and for every 100 females age 18 and over there were 92.0 males age 18 and over.

100.0% of residents lived in urban areas, while 0.0% lived in rural areas.

There were 1,494 households in Brackenridge, of which 22.1% had children under the age of 18 living in them. Of all households, 29.5% were married-couple households, 24.9% were households with a male householder and no spouse or partner present, and 36.5% were households with a female householder and no spouse or partner present. About 41.1% of all households were made up of individuals and 18.5% had someone living alone who was 65 years of age or older.

There were 1,675 housing units, of which 10.8% were vacant. The homeowner vacancy rate was 2.7% and the rental vacancy rate was 8.9%.

Racial composition as of the 2020 census
Race	Number	Percent
White	2,760	85.2%
Black or African American	227	7.0%
American Indian and Alaska Native	5	0.2%
Asian	19	0.6%
Native Hawaiian and Other Pacific Islander	1	0.0%
Some other race	16	0.5%
Two or more races	212	6.5%
Hispanic or Latino (of any race)	63	1.9%

=== 2000 census ===
As of the 2000 census, there were 3,543 people, 1,507 households, and 931 families residing in the borough. The population density was 6,924.2 inhabitants per square mile (2,673.4/km^{2}). There were 1,700 housing units at an average density of 3,322.4 per square mile (1,282.8/km^{2}). The racial makeup of the borough was 95.03% White, 3.44% African American, 0.11% Native American, 0.23% Asian, 0.03% Pacific Islander, 0.37% from other races, and 0.79% from two or more races. Hispanic or Latino of any race were 0.54% of the population.

There were 1,507 households, out of which 24.6% had children under the age of 18 living with them, 43.9% were married couples living together, 13.6% had a female householder with no husband present, and 38.2% were non-families. 34.2% of all households were made up of individuals, and 17.3% had someone living alone who was 65 years of age or older. The average household size was 2.28 and the average family size was 2.91.

In the borough, the population was spread out, with 20.5% under the age of 18, 7.2% from 18 to 24, 28.1% from 25 to 44, 22.0% from 45 to 64, and 22.3% who were 65 years of age or older. The median age was 41 years. For every 100 females, there were 80.7 males. For every 100 females age 18 and over, there were 78.3 males.

The median income for a household in the borough was $30,050, and the median income for a family was $41,803. Males had a median income of $30,661 versus $21,821 for females. The per capita income for the borough was $19,040. About 6.8% of families and 9.4% of the population were below the poverty line, including 15.9% of those under age 18 and 9.9% of those age 65 or over.

== Government and politics ==
Presidential Elections Results
Year	Republican	Democratic	Third Parties
2020	54% 776	43% 629	2% 30
2016	52% 648	44% 545	4% 54
2012	46% 526	53% 609	1% 20

== Education ==
Brackenridge is within the Highlands School District, which operates Highlands Early Childhood Center, formerly Fairmount Primary School (grades K–2), on the hill section in the borough.

== Notable people ==
- Bud Carson, professional football defensive coordinator, Cleveland Browns and Pittsburgh Steelers
- Adam Earnheardt, academic and author
- Cookie Gilchrist, African-American civil rights activist and former American Football League and Canadian Football League professional football player
- Ronald Robertson, Olympic silver medalist, figure skating
