= Brackenridge Works =

Steel mill in Pennsylvania

Coordinates: 40.60487°N 79.73376°W

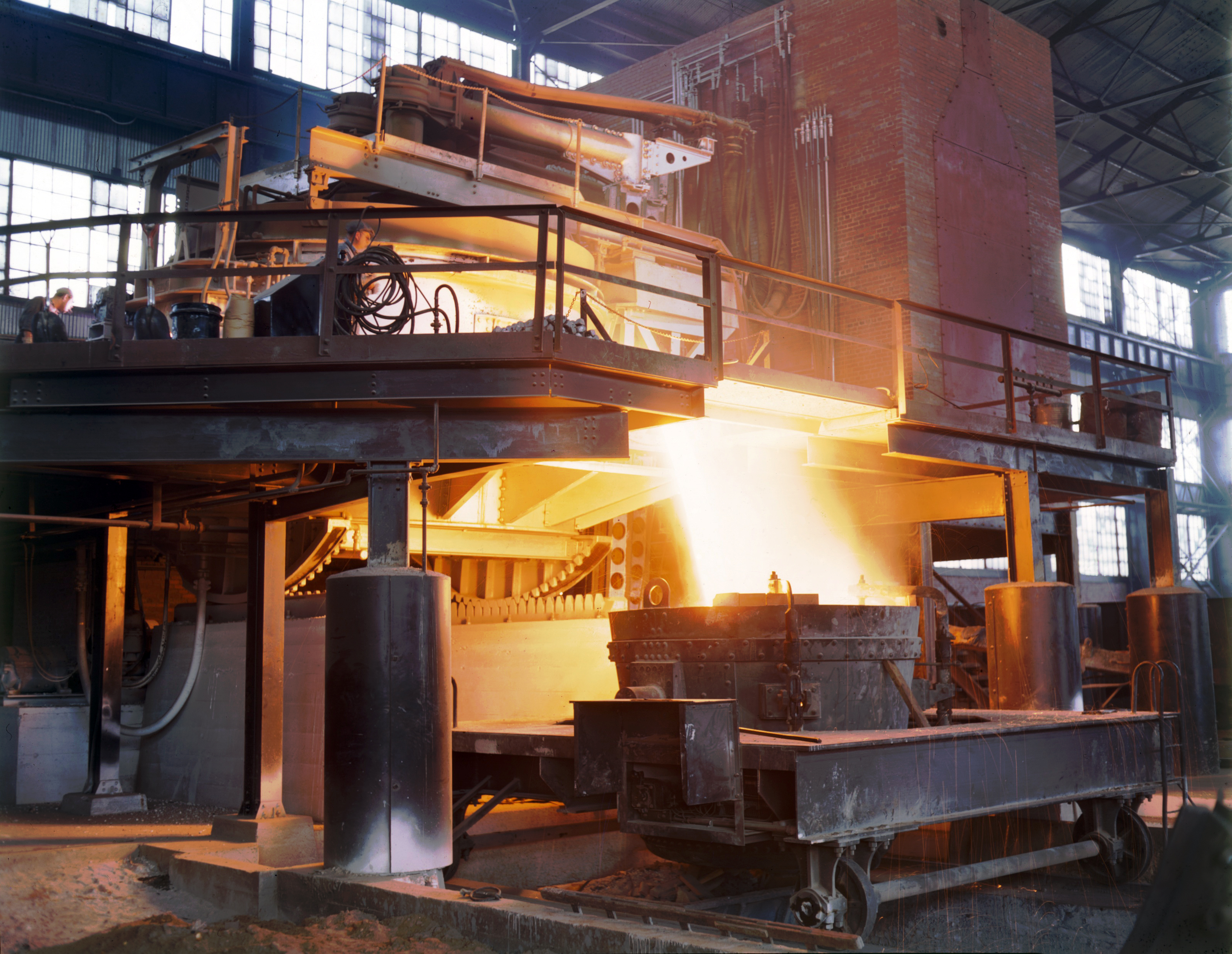
Allegheny Technologies' steel furnace in Natrona, Pennsylvania in a 1941 photo by Alfred T. Palmer

Brackenridge Works is a specialty steel mill facility owned by Allegheny Technologies and operated by its Flat-Rolled Products segment in the Pittsburgh suburbs of Natrona, Pennsylvania.
